= Languages of Botswana =

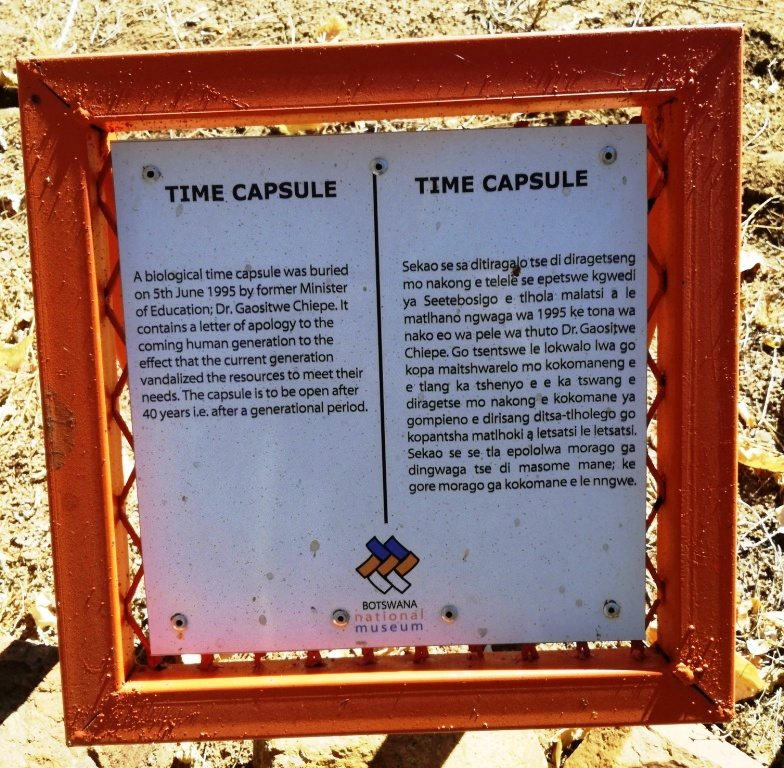
- Sign in English and Setswana at the National Botanical Garden of Botswana
- Official: English
- National: Setswana
- Recognised: Kalanga, Kgalagadi, Shona, Mbukushu, Ndebele, Tshwa, !Xóõ
- Foreign: Portuguese, Danish, Swahili, German, Afrikaans, French, Arabic
- Signed: American Sign Language; Danish Sign Language; German Sign Language
- Keyboard layout: QWERTY

The official language of Botswana is English, while Setswana is considered to be a national language. English, which was inherited from colonial rule, is the language of official business and most written communication. Most of the population speak Setswana, but over 20 smaller languages are also spoken. Some of the country's languages are in danger of becoming extinct.

== Official and national languages ==
The official written language of Botswana is English. Most written communication and official business texts are written in English. The language of the Tswana people—Setswana—is the country's national language, and is spoken by most of the population.

== Other languages ==
Aside from English and Setswana, other languages are spoken in the country. Over 90% of the population speak a Bantu language as their first language, according to the CIA's World Factbook. The most common Bantu languages spoken are Setswana (73.3% of the population), Kalanga (17.2%), Kgalagadi (2.4%), Shona (1%) Mbukushu (1.6%) and Ndebele (1%). 1.7% speak Tshwa (a Khoe language) and 0.1% speak !Xóõ, a Tuu language (both non-Bantu). English is spoken by 2.8% as their first language, and a small number speak Afrikaans.

The number of individual languages listed for Botswana is 31. All are living languages. Of these, 26 are indigenous and 5 are non-indigenous. Furthermore, 4 are institutional, 9 are developing, 8 are vigorous, 9 are in trouble, and 1 is dying.

== Languages spoken at home in Botswana ==
Main language	2001	2011	2022
Setswana	79.3	77.3	77.5
Kalanga	7.9	7.4	4.9
English	2.1	2.8	3.6
Shekgalagari	2.8	3.4	2.5
Zezuru	0.7	2.0	1.5
Sesarwa	1.9	1.7	1.4
Ndebele	0.5	1.0	0.8
Thimbukushu	1.7	1.6	0.8
Otjiherero	0.7	1.0	0.6
Afrikaans	0.4	0.4	0.3
Chisubia	0.4	0.3	0.2
Sheyeyi	0.3	0.2	0.1
Other	1.1	0.9	1.7
Not Stated	0.2	0.0	4.1

=== Languages spoken ===
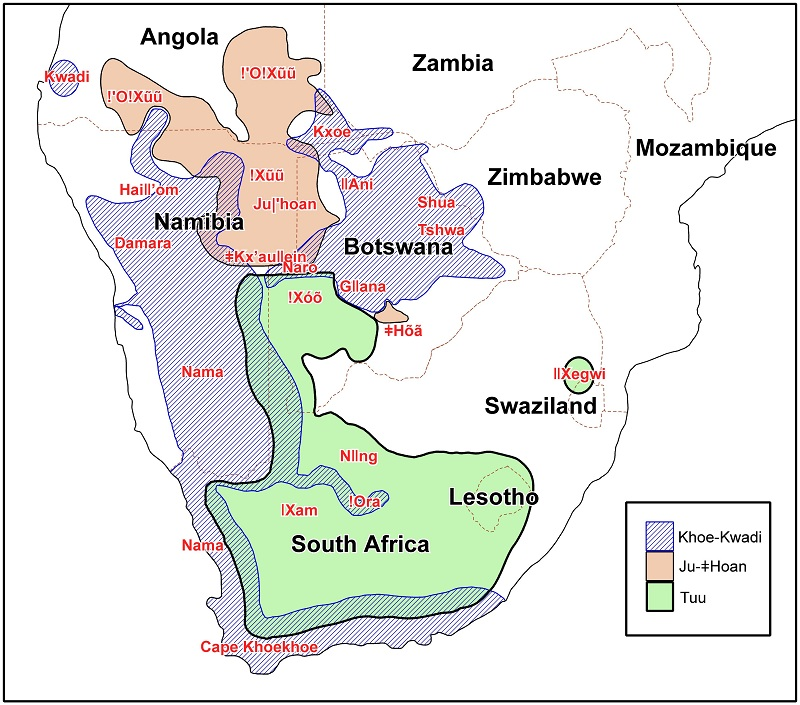
The distribution of the three major language families in the Kalahari Basin area

Languages of Botswana
Languages	Per cent
Setswana	77.3%
Ikalanga	7.4%
Shekgalagadi	3.4%
English	2.8%
Sesarwa	1.7%
Sembukushu	1.6%
Ndebele	1.0%
Seherero	1.0%
Afrikaans	0.4%
Sesubiya	0.3%
Seyeyi	0.2%
Other Asian	0.4%
Other European	0.4%
Other African	0.1%
Other	0.1%

1. Afrikaans
2. Ani
3. Birwa
4. Chichewa
5. English
6. Gana
7. Gciriku
8. Gwi
9. Haiǁom
10. Herero
11. ‡Hua
12. Ju|’hoansi
13. Kalanga
14. Kgalagadi
15. Khoekhoe
16. Khwedam
17. Kua
18. Kuhane
19. Kung-Ekoka
20. Lozi
21. Mbukushu
22. Nambya
23. Naro
24. Ndebele
25. Setswana
26. Shua
27. Tshuwau
28. Tswapong
29. !Xóõ
30. Yeyi
31. Zezuru
32. isiXhosa

== See also ==
- Khoisan languages

== Sources ==
- Mwakikagile, Godfrey (2009). Botswana Since Independence. Pretoria: New Africa Press. ISBN 9-780-98025-878-3.
