= Taa language =

Tuu language of southwestern Botswana and eastern Namibia

Taa
- ǃKhong / ǃXóõ
- Taa ǂaan / Tâa ǂâã
- Native to: Botswana, Namibia
- Region: Southern Ghanzi, northern Kgalagadi, western Southern and western Kweneng districts in Botswana; southern Omaheke and northeastern Hardap regions in Namibia.
- Native speakers: 2,500 (2011)
- Language family: Tuu: Taa–Lower Nossob; Taa
- Dialects: West ǃXoon (Nǀuǁʼen); ǃAma; East ǃXoon; Tsaasi–ǂHuan

Language codes
- ISO 639-3: nmn
- Glottolog: taaa1242
- ELP: Taa

Taa (/ˈtɑː/ TAH), also known as ǃXóõ (/ˈkoʊ/ KOH; ǃXóõ pronunciation: [ǃ͡χɔ̃ː˦], of which this latter name may also be spelled ǃKhong or ǃXoon), and formerly called by the dialect name ǂHoan (also known as Western ǂHoan, to distinguish from Eastern ǂHoan), is a Tuu language notable for its large number of phonemes, perhaps the largest in the world. It is also notable for having perhaps the heaviest functional load of click consonants, with one count finding that 82% of basic vocabulary items started with a click. Most speakers live in Botswana, but a few hundred live in Namibia. The people call themselves ǃXoon (pl. ǃXooŋake) or ʼNǀohan (pl. Nǀumde), corresponding to the dialect they speak. In 2011, there were around 2,500 speakers of Taa.

Taa is the word for 'human being'; the local name of the language is Taa ǂaan (Tâa ǂâã), from ǂaan 'language'. ǃXoon (ǃXóõ) is an ethnonym used at opposite ends of the Taa-speaking area, but not by Taa speakers in between. Most living Taa speakers are ethnic ǃXoon or ʼNǀohan.

Taa shares a number of characteristic features with West ǂʼAmkoe and Gǀui, which together are considered part of the Kalahari Basin sprachbund.

== Classification ==
Until the rediscovery of a few elderly speakers of Nǁng in the 1990s, Taa was thought to be the last surviving member of the Tuu language family. The Tuu languages are one of the three language families that make up the typological group of Khoisan languages.

== Dialects ==
A Namibian woman, speaking in Taa, talks about how the girl's initiation ceremony was performed in the past.

There is sufficient dialectal variation in Taa that it might be better described as a dialect continuum than a single language. Taa dialects fall into two groups, suggesting a historical spread from west to east:

- Taa dialects
  - West Taa: Anthony Traill's West ǃXoon and Dorothea Bleek's Nǀuǁʼen
  - East Taa
    - ǃAma (Western)
    - (Eastern)
      - East ǃXoon (Lone Tree)
      - Tsaasi–ǂHuan
        - Tsaasi
        - ǂHuan

Traill worked primarily with East ǃXoon, and the DoBeS project is working with ʼNǀohan (in East Taa) and West ǃXoon.

== Alternate names ==
The various dialects and social groups of the Taa, their many names, the unreliability of transcriptions found in the literature, and the fact that names may be shared between languages and that dialects have been classified, has resulted in a great deal of confusion. Traill (1974), for example, spent two chapters of his Compleat Guide to the Koon [sic] disentangling names and dialects.

The name ǃXoon (more precisely ǃXóõ) is only used at Aminius Reserve in Namibia, around Lone Tree where Traill primarily worked, and at Dzutshwa (Botswana). It is, however, used by the ǃXoon for all Taa speakers. It has been variously spelled ǃxō, ǃkɔ̃ː, ǃko/ǃkõ, Khong, and the fully anglicized Koon.

Bleek's Nǀuǁʼen dialect (Note: Distinguish ǁNg ǃʼe, a form of Nǁng, and ǁŨǁʼe, which is related to Seroa.) has been spelled ǀNuǁen, ǀNuǁe꞉n, Ngǀuǁen, Nguen, Nǀhuǁéi, ŋǀuǁẽin, ŋǀuǁẽi, ŋǀuǁen, ǀuǁen. It has also been called by the ambiguous Khoekhoe term Nǀusan (Nǀu-san, Nǀūsā, Nǀuusaa, Nǀhusi), sometimes rendered Nusan or Noosan, which has been used for other languages in the area. A subgroup was known as Koon [kɔ̃ː]. This dialect is apparently extinct.

Westphal studied ǂHuan (ǂhũa) dialect (or ǂHũa-ʘwani), and used this name for the entire language. However, the term is ambiguous between Taa (Western ǂHũa) and ǂʼAmkoe (Eastern ǂHũa), and for this reason Traill chose to call the language ǃXóõ.

Tsaasi dialect is quite similar to ǂHuan, and like ǂHuan, the name is used ambiguously for a dialect of ǂʼAmkoe. This is a Tswana name, variously rendered Tshasi, Tshase, Tʃase, Tsase, Sasi, and Sase.

The Tswana term for Bushmen, Masarwa, is frequently encountered. More specific to the Taa are Magon (Magong) and the Tshasi mentioned above.

The Taa distinguish themselves along at least some of the groups above. Like many San peoples, they also distinguish themselves by the environment they live in (plain people, river people, etc.), and also by direction. Traill reports the following:

ǃama ʘʔâni "westerners"
ǂhūã ʘʔâni "southerners"
ʘqhōa ʘʔâni "in-betweeners"
tùu ʔʘnāhnsā̂ "pure people"

Heinz reports that ǃxóõ is an exonym given by other Bushmen, and that the Taa call themselves ǃxoia.

The Taa refer to their language as tâa ǂâã "people's language". Westphal (1971) adopted the word tâa "person" as the name for the Southern Khoisan language family, which is now called Tuu. The East ǃXoon term for the language is ǃxóɲa ǂâã [ǃ͡χɔ˦ ɲa˧ ǂãː˧˩].

== Phonology ==
Taa has at least 58 consonants, 31 vowels, and four tones (Traill 1985, 1994 on East ǃXoon), or at least 87 consonants, 20 vowels, and two tones (DoBeS 2008 on West ǃXoon), by many counts the largest segment inventory of any known language (if vowels other than oral modal vowels are counted as unique segments). (Note: Otherwise Taa has only five vowel phonemes. Jinhui dialect has largest oral vowel quality inventory but has far fewer non-oral qualities than Taa.) These include 20 (Traill) or 43 (DoBeS) click consonants and several vowel phonations, though opinions vary as to which of the 122 (DoBeS) or 130 (Traill) consonant sounds are single segments and which are consonant clusters. DoBeS notes that analysis of syllable onsets as clusters would reduce the inventory from 122 to approximately 88 consonants.

=== Tones ===
Anthony Traill describes four tones for the East ǃXoon dialect: high [á], mid [ā], low [à], and mid-falling [â]. Patterns for bisyllabic bases include high-high, mid-mid, mid-mid-falling, and low-low. DoBeS describes only two tonemes, high and low, for the West ǃXoon dialect. By analyzing each base as bimoraic, Traill's four tones are mapped onto [áá], [àá], [àà], and [áà]. Unlike Traill, Naumann does not find a four-way contrast on monomoraic grammatical forms in Eastern ǃXoon data.

In addition to lexical tone, Traill describes East ǃXoon nouns as falling into two tone classes according to the melody induced on concordial morphemes and transitive verbs: either level (Tone Class I) or falling (Tone Class II). Transitive object nouns from Tone Class I trigger mid/mid-rising tone in transitive verbs, while Tone Class 2 objects correlate with any tone contour. Naumann finds the same results in the eastern ʼNǀohan dialect.

=== Vowels ===
	Front	Central	Back
Close	i		u
Mid	e		o
Open		a	

Taa has five vowel qualities, /i e a o u/. The Traill and DoBeS descriptions differ in the phonations of these vowels; it's not clear if this reflects a dialectal difference or a difference of analysis.

==== East ǃXoon (Traill) ====
Traill describes the phonations of the East ǃXoon dialect as plain (e.g. /a o u/), murmured (e.g. /a̤ o̤ ṳ/), or glottalized (e.g. /a̰ o̰ ṵ/). The non-high vowels may also be both glottalized and murmured simultaneously /a̰̤ o̰̤ ṵ̤/, as well as strident ('sphincteric') /a𐞴 o𐞴 u𐞴/. Two vowels, /a̰𐞴 ṵ𐞴/, are both strident and glottalized, yielding 26 vowels not counting nasalization or length.

Murmured vowels after plain consonants contrast with plain vowels after aspirated consonants, and likewise glottalized vowels with ejective consonants, so these are phonations of the vowels and not assimilation with consonant phonation.

Vowels may be long or short, but long vowels may be sequences rather than distinct phonemes. The other vowel quality sequences—better known as diphthongs—disregarding the added complexity of phonation, are /ai, ae, ao, au, oi, oe, oa, ou, ui, ue, ua/.

All plain vowels may be nasalized. No other phonation may be nasalized, but nasalization occurs in combination with other phonations as the second vowel of a sequence ("long vowel" or "diphthong"). These sequences alternate dialectally with vowel plus velar nasal. That is, the name ǃXóõ may be dialectally [kǃxóŋ], and this in turn may be phonemically /kǃxóɲ/, since [ɲ] does not occur word-finally. However, this cannot explain the short nasal vowels, so Taa has at least 31 vowels.

For example, a long, glottalized, murmured, nasalized o with falling tone is written ⟨ôʼhõ⟩, while a long, strident nasalized o with low tone is written ⟨òqhõ⟩, since Traill analyzes stridency as phonemically pharyngealized murmur. (Note that phonetically these are distinct phonations.)

==== West ǃXoon (DoBeS) ====
DoBeS describes the phonations of the West ǃXoon dialect as plain, a e i o u; nasalized, an en in on un; epiglottalized or pharyngealized, aq eq iq oq uq; strident, aqh eqh iqh oqh uqh; and glottalized or 'tense', aʼ eʼ iʼ oʼ uʼ.

=== Consonants ===
Taa is unusual in allowing mixed voicing in its consonants. These have been analyzed as prevoiced, but also as consonant clusters. When homorganic, as in [dt], such clusters are listed in the chart below.

Taa consonants are complex, and it is not clear how much of the difference between the dialects is real and how much is an artifact of analysis.

==== East ǃXoon (Traill) ====
East ǃXoon dialect: Non-click consonants (Traill 2018)
		Labial	Dental	Alveolar	Palatal	Velar	Uvular	Glottal
Plosive/ Affricate	voiced	b	d̪	dz	(ɟ)	ɡ	ɢ [ᶰɢ]	
Plosive/ Affricate	tenuis	(p)	t̪	ts		k	q	ʔ
Plosive/ Affricate	voiceless aspirated	(pʰ)	t̪ʰ	tsʰ		kʰ	qʰ	
Plosive/ Affricate	prevoiced aspirated		ˬd̪̊ʰ	ˬd̥sʰ		(ˬɡ̊ʰ)	(ˬɢ̥ʰ) [ᶰɢ͡qʰ]	
Plosive/ Affricate	velarized	(pχ)	t̪χ	tsχ				
Plosive/ Affricate	prevoiced velarized (Note: voiced lead, voiceless at release)		ˬd̥χ	ˬd̥sχ				
Plosive/ Affricate	voiceless ejective		(t̪ʼ)	tsʼ		(kʼ)	(qʼ)	
Plosive/ Affricate	ejective cluster (Note: The final element of all of these varies dialectically between [kxʼ] and [kxʼq].)	(pʼkχʼ)	t̪ʼkχʼ	tsʼkχʼ		kxʼ		
Plosive/ Affricate	prevoiced ejective (Note: "There is voice lead followed by an ejected stop followed by an ejected velar affricate. kχʼ is [kχʼ] or [kχʼq].")		ˬd̪̊ʼkχʼ	ˬd̥sʼkχʼ		ˬɡ̊xʼ		
Fricative		(f)		s		x		(h)
Nasal	voiced	m	n̪		-ɲ-	-ŋ		
Nasal	glottalized	ˀm		ˀn				
Other		-β-		-l-	-j-			

Consonants in parentheses are rare.

The nasal [ɲ] only occurs between vowels, and [ŋ] only word finally (and then only in some dialects, for what are nasal vowels elsewhere), so these may be allophones. [β], [l], [j] also only occur in medial position, except that the last is an allophone of rare initial [ɟ]. [dʒ] and [w] (not in the table) occur in loans, mostly English.

Taa is typologically unusual in having mixed-voice ejectives. Juǀʼhoansi, which is part of the same sprachbund as Taa, has mixed voicing in [d͡tʰ, d͡tʃʰ, d͡tsʼ].

Taa may have as few as 83 click sounds, if the more complex clicks are analyzed as clusters. Given the intricate clusters posited seen in the non-click consonants, it is not surprising that many of the Taa clicks should be analyzed as clusters. However, there is some debate whether these are actually clusters; all non-Khoisan languages in the world that have clusters allow clusters with sonorants like r, l, w, j (as in English tree, sleep, quick, cue), and this does not occur in Taa.

There are five click articulations: bilabial, dental, lateral, alveolar, and palatal. There are nineteen series, differing in phonation, manner, and complexity (see airstream contour). These are perfectly normal consonants in Taa, and indeed are preferred over non-clicks in word-initial position.

East ǃXoon dialect: Click consonants (Traill 2018)
noisy clicks			'sharp' clicks'		manner, along with speaker or dialect variation	DoBeS cluster analysis	Miller (2011) analysis
bilabial	dental	lateral	alveolar	palatal	manner, along with speaker or dialect variation	DoBeS cluster analysis	Miller (2011) analysis
kʘ	kǀ	kǁ	kǃ	kǂ	Weak tenuis [k] release	kꞰ	Ʞ (Note: ⟨Ʞ⟩ is a wildcard letter for any click, or in this context any click articulation.)
ɡʘ	ɡǀ	ɡǁ	ɡǃ	ɡǂ	Voiced velar [ɡ] throughout the hold of the click	ɡꞰ	ᶢꞰ
ʘq	ǀq	ǁq	ǃq	ǂq	Released as a tenuis uvular stop [q] that is delayed considerably beyond the release of the click	kꞰ + q	Ʞ͜q
ɴʘɢ	ɴǀɢ	ɴǁɢ	ɴǃɢ	ɴǂɢ	Prenasalized [ɴ], with a voiced uvular release [ɢ]	kꞰ + ɢ	ᶢꞰ͜ɢ
ɡʘh	ɡǀh	ɡǁh	ɡǃh	ɡǂh	Voiced lead with delayed aspiration (phonemically voiced lead with simple aspiration)	ɡꞰ + qʰ	ᶢꞰʱ
ʘqʰ	ǀqʰ	ǁqʰ	ǃqʰ		Cineradiography shows that the articulation is indeed uvular [qʰ]	kꞰ + qʰ ?*	Ʞ͜qʰ
	(ɴɢǀqʰ)	(ɴɢǁqʰ)	(ɴɢǃqʰ)	(ɴɢǂqʰ)	"Prenasalization with a uvular nasal [ɴ] and a brief uvular stop before the click, which is followed by an aspirated uvular stop"	ɡꞰ + ɢqʰ	ᶢꞰ͜ɢʱ
ʘx	kǀχ	kǁχ	kǃχ	kǂχ	Voiceless velar affricate [kx] release, considerably fricative	kꞰ + x	Ʞ͜qχ
ɡʘχ	ɡǀχ	ɡǁχ	ɡǃχ	ɡǂχ	Voiced lead which ceases before the release of the click, like ɡkx. In some dialects, voiced throughout: [gꞰɣ].	ɡꞰ + x	ᶢꞰ͜ɢʁ
ʘkχʼ	ǀkχʼ	ǁkχʼ	ǃkχʼ	ǂkχʼ	Released into [kχʼ] or [kʼq], depending on dialect	kꞰ + kxʼ	Ʞ͜kxʼ
ɡʘkχʼ	ɡǀkχʼ	ɡǁkχʼ	ɡǃkχʼ	ɡǂkχʼ	Voiced lead, [kχʼ] or [kʼq] release	ɡꞰ + kxʼ	ᶢꞰ͜kxʼ
kʘˀ	kǀˀ	kǁˀ	kǃˀ	kǂˀ	Silent release, followed after some delay by the release of a glottal stop [ʔ]	kꞰ + ʔ	ᵑꞰˀ
ʘqʼ	ǀqʼ	ǁqʼ	ǃqʼ	ǂqʼ	Released as an unaffricated uvular ejective [qʼ]	Ʞ͜qʼ	
n̥ʘ	n̥ǀ	n̥ǁ	n̥ǃ	n̥ǂ	Voiceless nasal airflow [ŋ̊] throughout the hold of the click	ŋ̊Ʞ	ᵑ̊Ʞ
nʘ	nǀ	nǁ	nǃ	nǂ	Voiced velar nasal airflow [ŋ] throughout the hold of the click	ŋꞰ	ᵑꞰ
ʔnʘ	ʔnǀ	ʔnǁ	ʔnǃ	ʔnǂ	Preglottalized nasal [ˀŋ], "best described as a click superimposed on the sequence [ʔŋ] ... the release of the click is immediately after a brief period of [ŋ]"	kꞰ + mˀ/nˀ	ˀᵑꞰ
ɴ̥ʘh	ɴ̥ǀh	ɴ̥ǁh	ɴ̥ǃh	ɴ̥ǂh	Delayed aspiration: inaudible release followed by crescendo aspiration. (Note: Inaudibility achieved "by a complex venting of the pulmonic pressure (Traill 1992). In fast speech the venting may sometimes be accompanied by a brief period of nasalization of the vowel and an intrusive velar nasal preceding the click." Ladefoged characterized them as ingressive voiceless nasal airflow [↓ŋ̊] with delayed aspiration.)	kꞰ + h	ᵑ̊Ʞʰ

The DoBeS project takes Traill's cluster analysis to mean that only the twenty tenuis, voiced, nasal, and voiceless nasal clicks are basic, with the rest being clusters of the tenuis and voiced clicks with x, kxʼ, q, ɢ, qʰ, ɢqʰ, qʼ, ʔ, h and either mˀ or nˀ. Work on Taa's sister language Nǁng suggests that all clicks in both languages have a uvular or rear articulation, and that the clicks considered to be uvular here are actually lingual–pulmonic and lingual–glottalic airstream contours. It may be that the 'prevoiced' consonants of Taa, including prevoiced clicks, can also be analyzed as contour consonants, in this case with voicing contours.

* DoBeS only matches 17 series to Traill, as the Ʞkʰ–Ʞqʰ and Ʞkʼ–Ʞqʼ distinctions he discovered had not yet been published. DoBeS ⟨Ʞh⟩ and ⟨Ʞqh⟩, respectively, correspond to the former pair, while ⟨Ʞʼ⟩ and ⟨Ʞʼʼ⟩ (presumably in that order, as uvular clicks tend to have a delayed release) correspond to the latter pair.

Traill's account of East ǃXoon leaves for voiceless series of clicks without equivalents with a voiced lead. The DoBeS account of West ǃXoon, which uses voicing for morphological derivation to a greater extent than East ǃXoon does, has four additional series, written nꞰʼʼ, gꞰʼ, gꞰqʼ and nꞰhh in their practical orthography. The first three match the unpaired glottalized series of Traill, Ʞˀ (= ᵑꞰˀ), Ʞkʼ, Ʞqʼ. If Traill's ɡꞰh series is the voiced equivalent of plain aspirated Ʞʰ, rather than delayed aspirated, that would leave the DobeS nꞰhh series as voiced delayed aspiration.

All nasal clicks have twin airstreams, since the air passing through the nose bypasses the tongue. Usually this is pulmonic egressive. However, the ↓ŋ̊Ʞh series in Taa is characterized by pulmonic ingressive nasal airflow. Ladefoged & Maddieson (1996:268) state that "This ǃXóõ click is probably unique among the sounds of the world's languages that, even in the middle of a sentence, it may have ingressive pulmonic airflow." Taa is the only language known to contrast voiceless nasal and voiceless nasal aspirated (i.e. delayed aspirated) clicks (Miller 2011).

==== West ǃXoon (DoBeS) ====
In a strict unit analysis, West ǃXoon has 164 consonants, 111 of which are clicks in 23 series. Under a cluster analysis this is reduced to 88 consonants, 43 of which are clicks in 9 series. (Note: The clicks occur at five places of articulation, all of those documented for clicks excluding retroflex. Bilabial clicks do not occur in the voiced ejective or voiceless nasal series, bringing the number down from 45 to 43.) The table below follows the cluster analysis.

These are written in the practical orthography (Naumann 2008). Marginal consonants are not marked as such.

West ǃXoon dialect (DoBeS): Consonants
		Labial	Alveolar		Palatal	Velar	Uvular		Glottal	Click
Plosive/ Affricate	voiced	b	d	d͡z		ɡ	ᶰɢ			gꞰ
Plosive/ Affricate	tenuis	p	t	t͡s		k	q		(ʔ)	Ʞ
Plosive/ Affricate	aspirated	pʰ	tʰ	t͡sʰ		kʰ	qʰ			Ʞh
Plosive/ Affricate	voiced aspirated	bʱ	dʱ	d͡zʱ		ɡʱ	ᶰɢʱ			gꞰh
Plosive/ Affricate	ejective	pʼ	tʼ	t͡sʼ		kʼ	qʼ	q͡χʼ		Ʞʼ
Plosive/ Affricate	voiced 'ejective'			d͡zˀ		ɡˀ	ɢˀ	ɢ͡ʁˀ		gꞰʼ
Fricative		f	s				χ		ɦ	
Nasal	voiced	m	n		ɲ	ŋ				nꞰ
Nasal	voiceless									nhꞰ
Nasal	glottalized	ˀm	ˀn							ʼnꞰ
Approximant		w	l		j					
Tap			ɾ							

Vowel nasalization is only phonemic on the second mora (in e.g. CCVV syllables), as it is a phonetic effect of the ⟨nꞰhh⟩ clicks on the first mora. The ⟨nꞰhh⟩ clicks do not make the following vowel breathy, maintaining a contrast between ⟨nǂhha⟩ and ⟨nǂhhah⟩. Likewise, while ⟨gꞰʼ⟩ clicks do make the following vowel creaky, there is a delayed onset to the vowel and the amplitude of the glottalization of ⟨gǂʼaʼ⟩ is less than that of ⟨gǂaʼ⟩ with a phonemically creaky vowel.

In an attempt to keep the phonemic inventory as symmetric as possible, the DoBeS team analyzed as segments two of the click types that Traill analyzed as clusters. These are the pre-glottalized nasal clicks, ʼnꞰ, which Traill had analyzed as /Ʞ/ + /ʼn/, and the voiced aspirated clicks, gꞰh, which Traill had analyzed as /ɡꞰ/ + /qʰ/.

The expectation, from the morphology of ǃXoon, for voiceless-voiced pairs of click clusters led to the discovery of several series not distinguished by Traill. (This morphology appears to be more pervasive in West ǃXoon than in the East ǃXoon dialect that Traill worked on.) These are voiced click types which may not exist in East ǃXoon at all, namely nꞰʼʼ, nꞰhh, gꞰʼ, and gꞰqʼ. It also lead to the rediscovery of two series that Traill had not been able to publish before his death. Thus the DoBeS team distinguishes two series, Ʞqh and Ʞh, for Trail's Ʞqh and Ʞkh, as well as Ʞʼʼ and Ʞʼ for Traill's Ʞqʼ and Ʞkʼ (or perhaps vice versa). If Traill's Ʞkh series is to be analyzed as kꞰ + h, then that would require a different assessment of Traill's delayed-aspiration series.

Under the contour analysis of Miller (2009), the distinction between simple and contour clicks largely parallels the DoBeS identification of clusters, apart from the last four rows (Ʞʼʼ, nꞰʼʼ, Ʞhh, nꞰhh), which are considered to be simple clicks.

=== Phonotactics ===
The Taa syllable structure, as described by DoBeS, may be one of the following:

- CVV
- CCVV
- CVC_{2}V
- CCVC_{2}V
- CVN
- CCVN

where C is a consonant, V is a vowel, and N is a nasal stop. There is a very limited number of consonants which can occur in the second (C_{2}) position and only certain vowel sequences (VV and V…V) occur. The possible consonant clusters (CC) is covered above; C_{2} may be [b~β̞], [dʲ~j], [l], [m], [n], [ɲ].

== Grammar ==
Taa is a subject–verb–object language with serial verbs and inflecting prepositions. Genitives, adjectives, relative clauses, and numbers come after the nouns they apply to. Reduplication is used to form causatives. There are five nominal agreement classes and an additional two tone groups. Agreement occurs on pronouns, transitive verbs (with the object), adjectives, prepositions, and some particles.

=== Numbers ===
Taa has only three native numbers. All numbers above three are loans from Tswana or Kgalagadi.

1. ǂʔûã
2. ǂnûm
3. ǁâe

== Phrases ==
The phrases from Eastern ǃXóõ were compiled by Anthony Traill:

ǃnˤù.ṵ ì à ǁʼà-be ǃù.m ʘàa sâa
Hare.14 1PRO PST take:S-3 Eland.3 child:34 thither
"As for Hare, she took Eland's child away."

ǃqháa̰ kū ǂnûm ǁɢˤûlitê ǀè dtxóʔlu ǀnàe ǂʼá sˤàa̰
give MPO:4PRO two genital:22-P ASS:3 stench:3 DAT:3PRO COM:2 fat:22
"Give them their stinking genitals with the fat!"
