= Lower Nossob language =

Extinct Khoisan language of Botswana

Lower Nossob
- ǀauo
- Native to: South Africa, Botswana
- Region: Nossob River
- Ethnicity: ǀʼAuni
- Extinct: 2005
- Language family: Tuu: Taa–Lower Nossob; Lower Nossob
- Dialects: ǀʼAuni; ǀHaasi

Language codes
- ISO 639-3: nsb
- Glottolog: lowe1407
- ǀʼAuni is classified as Extinct by the UNESCO Atlas of the World's Languages in Danger

Lower Nossob is an extinct Khoisan language once spoken along the Nossob River on the border of South Africa and Botswana, near Namibia. It was closely related to the Taa language.

There are two attested dialects: ǀʼAuni (pronounced /ˈaʊniː/ OW-nee), or ǀʼAuo, recorded by Dorothea Bleek, and ǀHaasi, recorded by Robert Story. ǀʼAuni is the word they formerly used for themselves; ǀʼAuo (or ǀʼAu) is what they called their language. ǀauni, ǁauni, Auni are misspellings. Other renderings of the name ǀHaasi are Kʼuǀha꞉si, Kiǀhasi, and Kiǀhazi.

== Doculects ==
Güldemann (2017) lists the following doculects as being Lower Nossob.

Label	Researcher	Date	Notes
ǀʼAuni	D. Bleek	1937	Bleek label SIV.
Khatia	D. Bleek	(notes)	= ǂʼEinkusi? Bleek label SIVa.
Kiǀhazi	Story	(notes)	= ǀHaasi. Bleek label SIVb.
