= Dciriku language =

Bantu language spoken in southern Africa

Dciriku
- Gciriku
- Rumanyo
- Region: Kavango East
- Ethnicity: Vagciriku, Vamanyo, Vashambyu
- Native speakers: 82,000 (2004–2018)
- Language family: Niger–Congo?: Atlantic–Congo; Benue–Congo; Southern Bantoid; Bantu; Kavango–Southwest; Kavango; Dciriku
- Dialects: Gciriku; Shambyu; Mbogedu †

Language codes
- ISO 639-3: diu
- Glottolog: diri1252
- Guthrie code: K.331,334 (K.332)
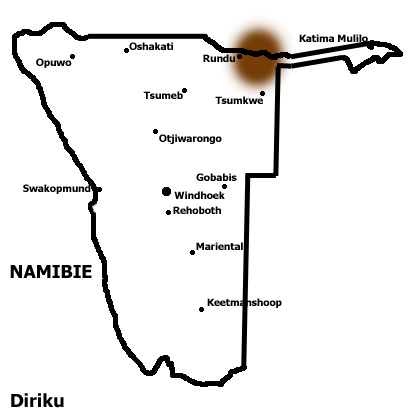

Dciriku, or Gciriku (Diriku, Dirico, Manyo or Rumanyo), is a Bantu language spoken by 305,000 people along the Kavango River in Namibia, Botswana and Angola. 24,000 people speak Dciriku in Angola, according to Ethnologue. It was first known in the west via the Vagciriku, who had migrated from the main Vamanyo area and spoke Rugciriku, a dialect of Dciriku. The name Gciriku (Dciriku, Diriku) remains common in the literature, but within Namibia the name Rumanyo has been revived. The Mbogedu dialect is extinct; Maho (2009) lists it as a distinct language, and notes that the names 'Manyo' and 'Rumanyo' are inappropriate for it.

== Phonology ==
=== Vowels ===
	Front	Central	Back
Close	i		u
Mid	ɛ		ɔ
Open		ɑ	

=== Consonants ===
		Bilabial	Labio- dental	Dental	Alveolar	Postalveolar/ Palatal	Velar	Glottal
Click	voiceless			ᵏǀ				
Click	voiced			ᶢǀ				
Click	prenasal vl.			ᵑǀᵏ				
Click	prenasal vd.			ᵑǀᶢ				
Click	prenasal asp.			ᵑǀʰ				
Nasal		m			n	ɲ	ŋ	
Stop/ Affricate	voiceless	p		t̪	t	t͡ʃ	k	
Stop/ Affricate	voiced	b			d	d͡ʒ	g	
Stop/ Affricate	prenasal vl.	ᵐpʰ		ⁿt̪	ⁿtʰ	ᶮt͡ʃ	ᵑkʰ	
Stop/ Affricate	prenasal vd.	ᵐb			ⁿd	ᶮd͡ʒ	ᵑɡ	
Fricative	voiceless		f		s	ʃ		h
Fricative	voiced	β	v		z		ɣ	
Fricative	prenasal vl.		ᶬf					
Fricative	prenasal vd.		ᶬv					
Trill					r			
Approximant					l	j	w	

- Clicks are mainly dental [ǀ], but may also have various articulation points as [ǁ], [ǃ].
- Most consonants are also palatalized [ʲ] or labialized [ʷ] when before glides /j, w/.
- /ɡ/ is realized as a fricative [χ] in Afrikaans loanwords.

==== Clicks ====
It is one of several Bantu languages of the Okavango which have click consonants, as in [ǀɛ́ǀˀà] 'bed', [mùǀûkò] 'flower', and [kàǀûrù] 'tortoise'. These clicks, of which there are half a dozen (c, gc, ch, and prenasalized nc and nch), are generally all pronounced with a dental articulation, but there is broad variation between speakers. They are especially common in place names and in words for features of the landscape, reflecting their sources in Khwe and Ju, two so-called Khoisan languages. Many of the words with clicks in Gciriku, including those in native Bantu vocabulary, are shared with Kwangali, Mbukushu, and Fwe.
