= Jonathan Westphal =

British philosopher

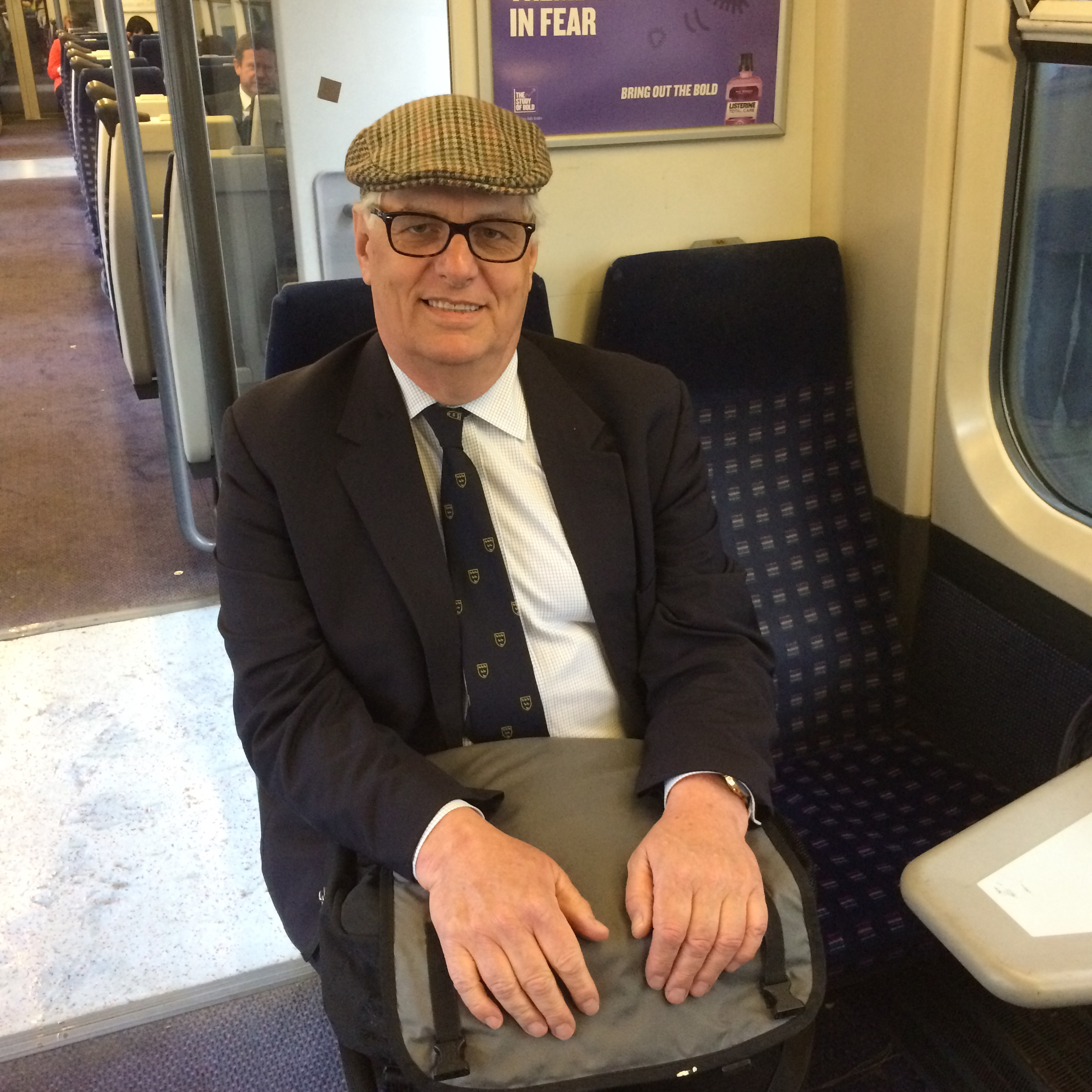
Jonathan Westphal, June 2016

Jonathan Westphal (born 1951) is a British philosopher working on the philosophy of mind, metaphysics, philosophy of science, logic, philosophy of language and aesthetics. He was a pioneer in the philosophy of color. More recently, he has become interested in issues in the philosophy of time and in the understanding of human freedom. In the history of philosophy, he has worked mostly on Wittgenstein and Leibniz. He lives in London, and works as a private tutor in philosophy.

== Career ==
Westphal received his BA from Harvard College in 1973, where he was offered tutorials by G.E.L. Owen as a Junior. He received an MA from the University of Sussex in 1975, and the PhD from the University of London in 1981, where he studied with David Wiggins. He has taught at the University of Hawaii, the University of London, Idaho State University, Amherst College, Hampshire College and at other colleges and universities in the UK and the US. He has been an Alexander von Humboldt Fellow, Alexander von Humboldt Foundation, at LMU Munich; he is a Fellow of Berkeley College (Yale University), and a Permanent Member of the Senior Common Room at University College, Oxford.

== Family and personal life ==
Jonathan Westphal is the youngest son of Ernst Oswald Johannes Westphal. Jonathan's great-grandfather and his great-grandmother, Gotthilf Ernst Westphal and his wife Wilhelmine, were teachers and mentors to the teenage Sol Plaatje, a student at their Mission Station in Pniel. Plaatje was a founder and the first General Secretary of the ANC. Jonathan Westphal is married to Stephanie Rosett, from New York City, and they have four children.

== Published works ==
Among Westphal's one hundred or so publications are:

- 1987 Colour: Some Philosophical Problems from Wittgenstein.
- 1991 Colour: a Philosophical Introduction, (Oxford: Blackwell, 1991, 2nd ed) ISBN 0631179348. In this work as in its 1987 predecessor Westphal subjects some of the statements in Wittgenstein's Remarks on Colour ("the puzzle propositions") to a detailed examination drawing on philosophy, phenomenology, psychology and physics. Rejecting Wittgenstein's grammatical explanation of colours, as well as the physicalists' reduction of colours to light emissions of specific wavelengths, Westphal argues that the puzzle propositions are analytic and that the relevant definitions are to be given in terms of phenomenalistically interpreted absorption spectra. According to WorldCat, the book is in 224 libraries
- 1998 Philosophical Propositions: An Introduction to Philosophy (London: Routledge, 1998). 169 pp. ISBN 0-415-17053-2. According to WorldCat, the book is held in 1206 libraries In this work Westphal presents an introduction to key philosophical problems in chapters titled: The Nature of a Philosophical Problem; Basic Concepts of Logic and Philosophy; the Problem of Evil; the Existence of God; Reality; Certainty; Time; Personal Identity; the Mind-Body Problem; Freewill and Determinism; the Meaning of Life?
- “Leibniz and the Lucky Proof”, in The History of Necessity, ed. Max Cresswell et al., Cambridge, Cambridge University Press, 2015.
- 2005 "Conflicting Appearances, Necessity and the Irreducibility of Propositions About Colours", Proceedings of the Aristotelian Society 105 (2):219-235. Reviewing the argument from 'conflicting appearances' for the view that nothing has any one colour, Westphal takes further a well-known criticism of the argument made by Austin and Burnyeat. He aIso undertakes the task of positive construction, offering a theory of what it is that all things coloured a particular colour have in common, and he argues that the resulting "color phenomenalism", rather than physicalism, is required to give a satisfactory account of the necessity of Wittgenstein's 'puzzle propositions' about colour.
- Westphal, Jonathan; Hardy, Jim (2005-10-01) [2004-02-16]. "Logic as a Vector System". Journal of Logic and Computation. 15 (5). Idaho State University, Pocatello, Idaho, USA: Oxford University Press: 751–765. doi:10.1093/logcom/exi040. Archived from the original on 2020-05-09. (15 pages). Propositional variables p, q, etc., are the unit vectors in a vector space, and various logical relations are represented, e.g. duality is the sliding of a vector through the origin, which produces De Morgan's Theorems.
- 2006 "The Future and the Truth-Value Links: A Common Sense View", Analysis 66 (289):1–9. This article is about the ancient problem of the truth of propositions about the future, or future contingents. Westphal argues that propositions about the future are true not because anything is now the case but because something will be the case. The problem is a confusion about tenses.
- 2008 ""My Body", "my X" and "I"" American Philosophical Quarterly, 45 (3):187-197. Sometimes 'My body is F follows from 'I am F, for example when F is "hot", but sometimes not, for example when F is "rich". Westphal offers a theory of the logical relations between "mind", "body", and "I" which gives a complete symmetry between mind and body.
- 2011 "Silhouettes Are Shadows", Acta Analytica 26 2:187-197. Here a solution is proposed to Sorensen’s problem about the eclipse of Near and Far. Since a silhouette is a shadow, what is seen is the silhouette or shadow of Far, into which Near has disappeared, as a smaller object might. Shadows are seen because the surface in shadow fails to reflect light.
- 2005, “Leibniz and the Lucky Proof”, in The History of Necessity, ed. Max Cresswell et al., Cambridge, Cambridge University Press.
- 2016 The Mind-Body Problem, (Cambridge MA: MIT Press, 2016) argues for a neutral monist solution to the mind-body problem, and claims that in the past neutral monists have paid almost no attention to the causal relations between mind and body.
- 2020 "Leibniz’s Proof of the Principle of Sufficient Reason from Considerations concerning Necessary and Sufficient Conditions”, Studia Leibnitiana, 229-241.
- 2022 "Elements of the Philosophy of 'Right'", Philosophical Investigations: 1-8. The argument of the paper is that there are four main senses of right. The two ethical ones ("according with a rule" and "appropriate") apply in exactly the same sense to ethical and non-ethical applications. "The right tool", for example, is one that does its job in the context of a set of requirements, and in so doing is the appropriate tool.
