= Anthony Traill (linguist) =

South African linguist

- Born: 27 February 1939; Pietermaritzburg, Natal, Union of South Africa (now Pietermaritzburg, South Africa)
- Died: 27 April 2007 (aged 68); Johannesburg, South Africa
- Education: University of the Witwatersrand; University of Edinburgh
- Scientific career
- Fields: Linguistics
- Workplaces: University of the Witwatersrand

Anthony Traill (27 February 1939 – 27 April 2007) was a South African linguist, phonetician, and professor. He was the world's foremost authority on !Xóõ, a Tuu language within the larger Khoisan category. He published widely on the language, including a dictionary.

Traill's publications focused on the phonetics of !Xóõ in relation to other Khoisan languages. He also contributed importantly to the Khoisan and Bantu phonetic literature on tone with respect to voice and breathy voice.

Traill was Professorial Research Fellow at Wits University for nearly the decade since he was Professor and Chair of Linguistics (until 1998), in the Department of Linguistics, at the University of the Witwatersrand, Johannesburg, South Africa. He spoke competent!Xóõ, having conducted research in the!Xóõ communities of Botswana on nearly 100 field trips over more than 35 years. He also spoke Zulu, Tsonga, Tswana and Afrikaans.

Traill developed a lump on his larynx after speaking!Xóõ for a long time, which is typical of adult native speakers, but not children, a testament to his time spent with the language.

After a long illness, Traill died on 27 April 2007, in Johannesburg, survived by his wife, Jill, and children, Stephen, Carol and Patrick.

== Publications ==
- Traill, Anthony. A!Xóõ Dictionary. (edited by Rainer Vossen). University Frankfurt/Main: Johann Wolfgang Goethe. ISBN 3-927620-56-4, OCLC 31270873. Volume 9 of "Research in Khoisan Studies", which has ISSN 0176-3369.
- Traill, Anthony (1986). Phonetic and Phonological Studies of!Xóõ Bushman. (Quellen Zur Khoisan-Forschung, No 1), John Benjamins, January 1, 1986, ISBN 3-87118-669-4.
- Traill, Anthony (1973). A Preliminary Sketch of!Xu) phonetics. Edinburgh University Department of Linguistics Work in Progress 6:1-23.
- Traill, Anthony (1985). Phonetic and Phonological Studies in!Xoo Bushman. Hamburg: Helmut Buske Verlag.
- Traill, A. (January 1990). "Depression without depressors". South African Journal of African Languages. 10 (4): 166–172. doi:10.1080/02572117.1990.10586849.
- Traill, Anthony. (1995). The Khoesan Languages. In Mesthrie, R. (ed.), Language in South Africa. 27–49. Cape Town: Cambridge University Press.
- Traill, A.; Khumalo, J.S.M.; Fridjhon, P. (January 1987). "Depressing facts about Zulu". African Studies. 46 (2): 255–274. doi:10.1080/00020188708707678.
