= Strident vowel =

Strongly pharyngealized vowels accompanied by (ary)epiglottal trill

◌𐞴

◌᷽

Strident vowels (also called sphincteric or epiglottalized vowels) are strongly pharyngealized vowels accompanied by an (ary)epiglottal trill, with the larynx being raised and the pharynx constricted. Either the epiglottis or the arytenoid cartilages thus vibrate instead of the vocal cords. That is, the epiglottal trill is the voice source for such sounds.

Strident vowels are fairly common in Khoisan languages, which contrasts them with simple pharyngealized vowels. Stridency is used in onomatopoeia in Zulu and Lamba. Stridency may be a type of phonation called harsh voice. A similar phonation, without the trill, is called ventricular voice; both have been called pressed voice. Bai, of southern China, has a register system that has allophonic strident and pressed vowels.

Subscript double tilde on the letter ⟨a⟩ (⟨a᷽⟩), to represent a strident vowel

There is no official symbol for stridency in the IPA, but a superscript ⟨𐞴⟩ (for a voiced epiglottal trill) is often used. In some literature, a double tilde below ⟨◌᷽⟩ (similar to the single tilde below ⟨◌̰⟩ used to transcribe creaky voice) has been used.

== Languages ==
These languages use phonemic strident vowels:

- Tuu languages
  - Taa (See Taa vowels)
  - ǃKwi (ǃUi)
    - Nǁng (a dialect cluster; moribund)
    - ǀXam (a dialect cluster, including Nǀuusaa) †

== See also ==
- Nasal vowel
- Vowel

== Bibliography ==
- Doke, C. M. (1936). "An outline of ǂKhomani Bushman phonetics". Bantu Studies. 10 (1): 433–460. doi:10.1080/02561751.1936.9676037.
- Esling, John H.; Moisik, Scott R.; Benner, Allison; Crevier-Buchman, Lise (2019). Voice Quality: The Laryngeal Articulator Model. Cambridge University Press. doi:10.1017/9781108696555. ISBN 9781108696555.
- Exter, Mats (2008-11-19). Properties of the Anterior and Posterior Click Closures in Nǀuu. Institut für Linguistik (Thesis). Universität zu Köln.
- Ladefoged, Peter; Maddieson, Ian (1996). The Sounds of the World's Languages. Oxford: Blackwell. ISBN 0-631-19815-6.
- Ladefoged, Peter; Maddieson, Ian (1990). "Vowels of the world's languages". Journal of Phonetics. 18 (2): 93–122. doi:10.1016/S0095-4470(19)30396-1. ISSN 0095-4470.
- Miller-Ockhuizen, Amanda (2003). The phonetics and phonology of gutturals: case study from Juǀʼhoansi. Outstanding dissertations in Linguistics. New York City, NY: Routledge. doi:10.4324/9780203506400. ISBN 978-0-415-86141-0. LCCN 2003046887.
- Moisik, Scott; Czaykowska-Higgins, Ewa; Esling, John H. (Winter 2012). Loughran, Jenny; McKillen, Alanah (eds.). "The Epilaryngeal Articulator: A New Conceptual Tool for Understanding Lingual-Laryngeal Contrasts". McGill Working Papers in Linguistics. 22 (1). McGill University.
