= Ernst Oswald Johannes Westphal =

South African linguist

Ernst Oswald Johannes Gotthard Gotthilf Westphal (Khalavha in Venda 1919 – Bredasdorp near Cape Town, 27 November 1990) was a South African linguist and an expert in Bantu and Khoisan languages. From 1949 to 1962 he taught at the School of Oriental and African Studies (SOAS), University of London.

== Biography ==
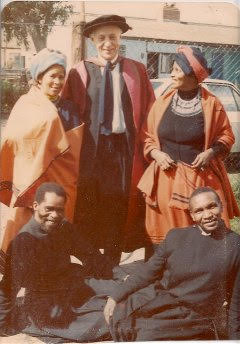
Professor Ernst Westphal at Cape Town University.

Ernst Westphal was born at Khalava in Venda, the son of German Lutheran missionary parents. His father was Gotthard Westphal and his grandfather, also Ernst Westphal, was with his wife Wilhelmine the teacher and mentor of Solomon Plaatje. Already as a child E.O.J. Westphal was fluent in German, English, and Afrikaans, like many South Africans. His first and native language, however, was Venda, and as a child he was initiated into the partly secret Venda rites for young men.

He studied Zulu and Southern Sotho under Clement Martyn Doke at the University of the Witwatersrand and, after graduating in 1942, was a Lecturer there 1942–1947. He was lecturer in Bantu Languages at the School of Oriental and African Studies (SOAS) at the University of London 1949–1962, where his best friend was Guy Atkins (the brother of Vera Atkins), also a scholar of African languages. Another friend and associate was Fenner Brockway. Westphal was Professor of African Languages in the School of African studies at the University of Cape Town, South Africa, from 1962 until his retirement in 1984, and was recognized as an authority on the click languages of the San people, the Khoisan languages, in many of which he was fluent. Rycroft has stated that Westphal spoke six major languages as a native, another six almost perfectly, and of the African languages two hundred or more spoken well. In Lisbon Westphal translated texts and inscriptions found in Mozambique from their original language into Portuguese on behalf of the Portuguese government, collaborating with Prof. de Almeida. Westphal's doctoral thesis The Sentence in Venda (University of London, 1955) is said to have been based entirely on his own knowledge of the language, using no other source.

Westphal's family has been deeply involved in the cultural life of South Africa for over a hundred years. His grandfather, Gotthilf Ernst Westphal, for example, saw the potential of the teenage Sol Plaatje, then a student at the Mission Station in Pniel, Northern Cape, and gave him private tuition. Among other contributions, Plaatje was a founder and first General Secretary of the African National Congress (ANC). Like E.O.J. Westphal, he possessed extraordinary linguistic gifts, and he was a polyglot.

Westphal was also one of the founders of SANCCOB (South African National Foundation for the Conservation of Coastal Birds), the story of which is documented in Marie Philip's book Gregory. Jackass Penguin, translated from the Afrikaans book by Marie Philip and Adèle Naudé: Gregory. Kaapse pikkewyn, 1971.

Westphal had three sons: Robin Peter, (1945-2015), Richard Geoffrey, (1948-1996), and Jonathan Westphal, born 1951. Prof. Westphal's second wife Althea had originally taken his ashes from Africa to Zennor, Cornwall, England, to be buried at St Senara's Church, but in the event he was buried in Port Appin, Scotland, near Glencoe, Highland. His tombstone carries the words, "A True Son of Venda".

A Festschrift was posthumously published in his honour, African linguistic contributions: presented in honour of Ernst Westphal, edited by Derek F. Gowlett (Pretoria: Via Afrika, 1992).

== Bibliography ==
Westphal published many scholarly articles and books, including:

- The Sentence in Venda, University of London, London School of Oriental and African Studies, 1955.
- Kwangari: An Index of Lexical Types, University of London, School of Oriental and African Studies, 1958.
- The Linguistic Prehistory of Southern Africa: Bush, Kwadi, Hottentot and Bantu Linguistic Relationships, Oxford University Press, 1963.
- Vowel systems and X-Ray photography : an assessment of the Cardinal Vowel Chart, School of African Studies, Cape Town, 1971.
- with Almeida, António de: Línguas não-bantas de Angola.
