= Kwangali language =

Bantu language spoken in Namibia and Angola

Kwangali
- Rukwangali
- Native to: Namibia, Angola
- Region: Kavango West
- Native speakers: 152,000 (2018)
- Language family: Niger–Congo?: Atlantic–Congo; Volta-Congo; Benue–Congo; Bantoid; Southern Bantoid; Bantu; Kavango–Southwest; Kavango; Kwangali

Language codes
- ISO 639-3: kwn
- Glottolog: kwan1273
- Guthrie code: K.33

Kwangali, or RuKwangali, is a Bantu language spoken by 85,000 people along the Kavango River in Namibia, where it is a national language, and in Angola. It is one of several Bantu languages of the Kavango which have click consonants; these are the dental clicks c and gc, along with prenasalization and aspiration.

Maho (2009) includes Mbunza as a dialect, but excludes Sambyu, which he includes in Manyo.

== Phonology ==
=== Consonants ===
		Bilabial	Labio- dental	Alveolar	Palatal	Velar	Glottal
Nasal		m		n	ɲ		
Plosive	voiceless	p		t	tʃ	k	
Plosive	aspirated	pʰ		tʰ		kʰ	
Plosive	voiced	b		d	dʒ	ɡ	
Plosive	prenasal vl.	ᵐpʰ		ⁿtʰ		ᵑkʰ	
Plosive	prenasal vd.	ᵐb		ⁿd	ⁿdʒ	ᵑɡ	
Fricative	voiceless		f	s	ʃ		h
Fricative	voiced	β	v	z			
Fricative	prenasal vl.		ᶬf	ⁿs			
Fricative	prenasal vd.		ᶬv	ⁿz			
Approximant				l	j	w	
Trill				r			

A dental click type [ǀ] may also be heard, being adopted from the neighboring Khoisan languages. The clicks may also tend to be heard as alveolar [!].

=== Vowels ===
	Front	Central	Back
High	i iː		u uː
Mid	e eː		o oː
Low		a aː	

Short vowels of /i e o u/ may also be pronounced as [ɪ ɛ ɔ ʊ].
