= Click consonant =

Speech sounds in several African languages

ʘ ǀ ǁ ǂ ǃ 𝼊o

Click releases
- In Unicode: U+0298 ʘ LATIN LETTER BILABIAL CLICK U+01C0 ǀ LATIN LETTER DENTAL CLICK; U+01C1 ǁ LATIN LETTER LATERAL CLICK; U+01C2 ǂ LATIN LETTER ALVEOLAR CLICK (Note: Unicode uses the obsolete descriptions of "retroflex click" for the alveolar-click character ⟨ǃ⟩ and "alveolar click" for the palatal-click character ⟨ǂ⟩.); U+01C3 ǃ LATIN LETTER RETROFLEX CLICK U+1DF0A 𝼊 LATIN LETTER RETROFLEX CLICK WITH RETROFLEX HOOK

Different from
- Different from: U+A668 Ꙩ CYRILLIC CAPITAL LETTER MONOCULAR O U+007C | VERTICAL LINE; U+2016 ‖ DOUBLE VERTICAL LINE; U+2021 ‡ DOUBLE DAGGER U+0021 ! EXCLAMATION MARK

Click consonants, or clicks, are speech sounds that occur as consonants in many languages of Southern Africa and in three languages of East Africa. Examples familiar to English-speakers are the dental click of the tut-tut (British spelling) or tsk! tsk! (American spelling) used to express disapproval or pity (IPA [ǀ]), the lateral click of the tchick! used to spur on a horse (IPA [ǁ]), and the alveolar click of the clip-clop! sound children make with their tongue to imitate a horse trotting (IPA [ǃ]). However, these paralinguistic sounds in English are not full click consonants, as they only involve the front of the tongue, without the release of the back of the tongue that is required for clicks to combine with vowels and form syllables.

Anatomically, clicks are obstruents articulated with two closures (points of contact) in the mouth, one forward and one at the back. The enclosed pocket of air is rarefied by a sucking action of the tongue (in technical terminology, clicks have a lingual ingressive airstream mechanism). The forward closure is then released, (Note: This is the case for all clicks used as consonants in words. Paralinguistically, however, there are other methods of making clicks: under the tongue or as above but by releasing the rear occlusion first. See § Places of articulation.) producing what may be the loudest consonants in the language, although in some languages such as Hadza and Sandawe, clicks can be more subtle and may even be mistaken for ejectives. The forward closure occurs at one of half a dozen places of articulation. The rear closure may be released simultaneously with the forward closure or after it; it may be silent, affricated or ejective. The consonant as a whole may also be nasalized, voiced, aspirated, glottalized etc.

== Phonetics and IPA notation ==
Click consonants occur at six principal places of articulation. The International Phonetic Alphabet (IPA) provides five letters for these places (there is as yet no dedicated symbol for the sixth).

- The easiest clicks for English speakers are the dental clicks written with ⟨ǀ⟩. These are sharp (high-pitched) squeaky sounds made by sucking on the front teeth. A simple dental click is used in English to express pity or to shame someone, or to call a cat or other animal, and is written tut! in British English and tsk! in American English. In many cultures around the Mediterranean a simple dental click is used for "no" in answer to a direct question. They are written with the letter c in Zulu and Xhosa.
- Next most familiar to English speakers are the lateral clicks, which are written with ⟨ǁ⟩. They are also squeaky sounds, though less sharp than [ǀ], made by sucking on the molars on either side (or both sides) of the mouth. A simple lateral click is made in English to get a horse moving, and is conventionally written tchick!. They are written with the letter x in Zulu and Xhosa.
- Then there are the bilabial clicks, written with ⟨ʘ⟩. These are lip-smacking sounds, but often without the pursing of the lips found in a kiss, that occur in words in only a few languages.

The above clicks sound like affricates, in that they involve a lot of friction. The next two families of clicks are more abrupt sounds that do not have this friction.

- With the alveolar clicks, written with ⟨ǃ⟩, the tip of the tongue is pulled down abruptly and forcefully from the roof of the mouth, sometimes using a lot of jaw motion, and making a hollow pop! like a cork being pulled from an empty bottle. Something like these sounds may be used for a 'clip-clop' sound as noted above. These sounds can be quite loud. They are written with the letter q in Zulu and Xhosa.
- The palatal clicks, ⟨ǂ⟩, are made with a flat tongue that is pulled backward rather than downward, and are sharper cracking sounds than the [ǃ] clicks, like sharply snapped fingers. They are not found in Zulu but are very common in the San languages of southern Africa.
- Finally, the retroflex clicks are poorly known, being attested from only a single language, Central !Kung. The tongue is curled back in the mouth, and they are both fricative and hollow sounding, but descriptions of these sounds vary between sources. This may reflect dialect differences. They are perhaps most commonly written ⟨‼⟩, but that is an ad hoc transcription. The expected IPA letter is ⟨𝼊⟩ (⟨ǃ⟩ with retroflex tail), and the IPA supported the addition of that letter to Unicode.

Technically, these IPA letters transcribe only the forward articulation of the click, not the entire consonant. As the Handbook states,

Since any click involves a velar or uvular closure [as well], it is possible to symbolize factors such as voicelessness, voicing or nasality of the click by combining the click symbol with the appropriate velar or uvular symbol: [k͡ǂ ɡ͡ǂ ŋ͡ǂ], [q͡ǃ].

Thus technically [ǂ] is not a consonant, but only one part of the articulation of a consonant, and one may speak of "ǂ-clicks" to mean any of the various click consonants that share the [ǂ] place of articulation. In practice, however, the simple letter ⟨ǂ⟩ has long been used as an abbreviation for [k͡ǂ], and in that role it is sometimes seen combined with diacritics for voicing (e.g. ⟨ǂ̬⟩ for [ɡ͡ǂ]), nasalization (e.g. ⟨ǂ̃⟩ for [ŋ͡ǂ]), etc. These differing transcription conventions may reflect differing theoretical analyses of the nature of click consonants, or attempts to address common misunderstandings of clicks.

== Languages with clicks ==
=== Southern Africa ===
Clicks occur in all three Khoisan language families of southern Africa, where they may be the most numerous consonants. To a lesser extent they occur in three neighbouring groups of Bantu languages—which borrowed them, directly or indirectly, from Khoisan. In the southeast, in eastern South Africa, Eswatini, Lesotho, Zimbabwe and southern Mozambique, they were adopted from a Tuu language (or languages) by the languages of the Nguni cluster (especially Zulu, Xhosa and Phuthi, but also to a lesser extent Swazi and Ndebele), and spread from them in a reduced fashion to the Zulu-based pidgin Fanagalo, Sesotho, Tsonga, Ronga, the Mzimba dialect of Tumbuka and more recently to Ndau and urban varieties of Pedi, where the spread of clicks continues. The second point of transfer was near the Caprivi Strip and the Okavango River where, apparently, the Yeyi language borrowed the clicks from a West Kalahari Khoe language; a separate development led to a smaller click inventory in the neighbouring Mbukushu, Kwangali, Gciriku, Kuhane and Fwe languages in Angola, Namibia, Botswana and Zambia. These sounds occur not only in borrowed vocabulary, but have spread to native Bantu words as well, in the case of Nguni at least partially due to a type of word taboo called hlonipha. Some creolised varieties of Afrikaans, such as Oorlams, retain clicks in Khoekhoe words.

=== East Africa ===
Three languages in East Africa use clicks: Sandawe and Hadza of Tanzania, and Dahalo, an endangered South Cushitic language of Kenya that has clicks in only a few dozen words. It is thought the latter may remain from an episode of language shift.

=== Damin ===
The only non-African language known to have clicks as regular speech sounds is Damin, a ritual code once used by speakers of Lardil in Australia. In addition, one consonant in Damin is the egressive equivalent of a click, using the tongue to compress the air in the mouth for an outward (egressive) "spurt".

== Use ==
=== Spread of clicks from loanwords ===
Once clicks are borrowed into a language as regular speech sounds, they may spread to native words, as has happened due to hlonipa word-taboo in the Nguni languages. In Gciriku, for example, the European loanword tomate (tomato) appears as cumáte with a click [ǀ], though it begins with a t in all neighbouring languages. It has also been argued that click phonemes have been adopted into some languages through the process of hlonipha, women refraining from saying certain words and sounds that were similar to the name of their husband, sometimes replacing local sounds by borrowing clicks from a nearby language.

=== Marginal usage of clicks ===
Scattered clicks are found in ideophones and mimesis in other languages, such as Kongo /ᵑǃ/, Mijikenda /ᵑǀ/ and Hadza /ᵑʘʷ/ (Hadza does not otherwise have labial clicks). Ideophones often use phonemic distinctions not found in normal vocabulary.

English and many other languages may use bare click releases in interjections, without an accompanying rear release or transition into a vowel, such as the dental "tsk-tsk" sound used to express disapproval, or the lateral tchick used with horses. In a number of languages ranging from the central Mediterranean to Iran, a bare dental click release accompanied by tipping the head upwards signifies "no". Libyan Arabic apparently has three such sounds. A voiceless nasal back-released velar click [ʞ] is used throughout Africa for backchanneling. This sound starts off as a typical click, but the action is reversed and it is the rear velar or uvular closure that is released, drawing in air from the throat and nasal passages.

Lexical clicks occasionally turn up elsewhere. In West Africa, clicks have been reported allophonically, and similarly in French and German, faint clicks have been recorded in rapid speech where consonants such as /t/ and /k/ overlap between words. In Rwanda, the sequence /mŋ/ may be pronounced either with an epenthetic vowel, [mᵊ̃ŋ], or with a light bilabial click, [m𐞵̃ŋ]—often by the same speaker.

Speakers of Gan Chinese produce flapped nasal clicks in nursery rhymes with varying degrees of competence, in the words for 'goose' and 'duck', both of which begin with /ŋ/ in Gan. A speaker from Ningdu county produced the nursery rhyme as:

[tʰien i tsʰak ᵑǃ¡o] 天上一隻鵝 'a goose in the sky'
[ti ha i tsʰak ᵑǃ¡a] 地下一隻鴨 'a duck on the ground'
[tʰien i tsʰak ᵑǃ¡a] 天上一隻鴨 'a duck in the sky'
[ti ha i tsʰak ᵑǃ¡o] 地下一隻鵝 'a goose on the ground'
[ᵑǃ¡o saŋ ᵑǃ¡o tʰan, ᵑǃ¡o pʰau ᵑǃ¡o] 鵝生鵝蛋鵝孵鵝 'a goose lays a goose egg, a goose hatches a goose'
[ᵑǃ¡a saŋ ᵑǃ¡a tʰan, ᵑǃ¡a pʰau ᵑǃ¡a] 鴨生鴨蛋鴨孵鴨 'a duck lays a duck egg, a duck hatches a duck'

where the Gan /ŋ/ onsets are all pronounced [ᵑǃ¡]. Such language games are apparently widespread in China. A Mandarin speaker from Beijing recited a similar rhyme, in which the word é [ɤ̌] 'goose' was pronounced with similar nasal clicks. (Until fairly recently this word began with /ŋ/ in Beijing Mandarin, and in other Mandarin dialects still does.) Of five instances of the word in the rhyme, three were flapped and two had a simple release; three were released into the nasal sound ([ǃŋ] or [ǃ¡ŋ]), one was prenasalized, and in one the burst was in the middle of the nasal sound.

Occasionally other languages are claimed to have click sounds in general vocabulary. This is usually a misnomer for ejective consonants, which are found across much of the world.

=== Position in word ===
For the most part, the Southern African Khoisan languages only use root-initial clicks. (Note: Exceptions occurs in words borrowed from Bantu languages, which may have click in the middle.) Hadza, Sandawe and several Bantu languages also allow syllable-initial clicks within roots. In no language does a click close a syllable or end a word, but since the languages of the world that happen to have clicks consist mostly of CV syllables and allow at most only a limited set of consonants (such as a nasal or a glottal stop) to close a syllable or end a word, most consonants share the distribution of clicks in these languages.

=== Number of click-types in languages ===
Most languages of the Khoesan families (Tuu, Kxʼa and Khoe) have four click types: { ǀ ǁ ǃ ǂ } or variants thereof, though a few have three or five, the last supplemented with either bilabial { ʘ } or retroflex { 𝼊 }. Hadza and Sandawe in Tanzania have three, { ǀ ǁ ǃ }. Yeyi is the only Bantu language with four, { ǀ ǁ ǃ ǂ }, while Xhosa and Zulu have three, { ǀ ǁ ǃ }, and most other Bantu languages with clicks have fewer.

== Types of clicks ==
Like other consonants, clicks can be described using four parameters: place of articulation, manner of articulation, phonation (including glottalisation) and airstream mechanism. As noted above, clicks necessarily involve at least two closures, which in some cases operate partially independently: an anterior articulation traditionally represented by the special click symbol in the IPA—and a posterior articulation traditionally transcribed for convenience as oral or nasal, voiced or voiceless, though such features actually apply to the entire consonant. The literature also describes a contrast between velar and uvular rear articulations for some languages.

In some languages that have been reported to make this distinction, such as Nǁng, all clicks have a uvular rear closure, and the clicks explicitly described as uvular are in fact cases where the uvular closure is independently audible: contours of a click into a pulmonic or ejective component, in which the click has two release bursts, the forward (click-type) and then the rearward (uvular) component. "Velar" clicks in these languages have only a single release burst, that of the forward release, and the release of the rear articulation isn't audible. However, in other languages all clicks are velar – for example Hadza, or uvular – for example Xhosa (at least for some speakers); and a few languages, such as Taa, have a true velar–uvular distinction that depends on the place rather than the timing of rear articulation and that is audible in the quality of the vowel.

Regardless, in most of the literature the stated place of the click is the anterior articulation (called the release or influx), whereas the manner is ascribed to the posterior articulation (called the accompaniment or efflux). The anterior articulation defines the click type and is written with the IPA letter for the click (dental ⟨ǀ⟩, alveolar ⟨ǃ⟩, etc.), whereas the traditional term 'accompaniment' conflates the categories of manner (nasal, affricated), phonation (voiced, aspirated, breathy voiced, glottalised), as well as any change in the airstream with the release of the posterior articulation (pulmonic, ejective), all of which are transcribed with additional letters or diacritics, as in the nasal alveolar click, ⟨ǃŋ⟩ or ⟨ᵑǃ⟩ or—to take an extreme example—the voiced (uvular) ejective alveolar click, ⟨ᶢǃ͡qʼ⟩.

The size of click inventories ranges from as few as three (in Sesotho) or four (in Dahalo), to dozens in the Kxʼa and Tuu (Northern and Southern Khoisan) languages. Taa, the last vibrant language in the latter family, has 45 to 115 click phonemes, depending on analysis (clusters vs. contours), and over 70% of words in the dictionary of this language begin with a click.

Clicks appear more stop-like (sharp/abrupt) or affricate-like (noisy) depending on their place of articulation: In southern Africa, clicks involving an apical alveolar or laminal postalveolar closure are acoustically abrupt and sharp, like stops, whereas labial, dental and lateral clicks typically have longer and acoustically noisier click types that are superficially more like affricates. In East Africa, however, the alveolar clicks tend to be flapped, whereas the lateral clicks tend to be more sharp.

== Transcription ==
The six places of articulation of clicks that have dedicated letters in the International Phonetic Alphabet (IPA) are labial ⟨ʘ⟩, dental ⟨ǀ⟩, lateral ⟨ǁ⟩, palatal ("palato-alveolar") ⟨ǂ⟩, (post)alveolar ("retroflex") ⟨ǃ⟩ and retroflex, with the 'implicit' letter ⟨𝼊⟩. In most languages, the alveolar and palatal types involve an abrupt release; that is, they are sharp popping sounds with little frication (turbulent airflow). The labial, dental and lateral types, on the other hand, are typically noisy: they are longer, lip- or tooth-sucking sounds with turbulent airflow, and are sometimes called affricates. (This applies to the forward articulation; both may also have either an affricate or non-affricate rear articulation as well.) The apical places, ǃ and ǁ, are sometimes called "grave", because their pitch is dominated by low frequencies; whereas the laminal places, ǀ and ǂ, are sometimes called "acute", because they are dominated by high frequencies. (At least in the Nǁng language and Juǀʼhoan, this is associated with a difference in the placement of the rear articulation: "grave" clicks are uvular, whereas "acute" clicks are pharyngeal.) Thus the alveolar click [kǃ] sounds something like a cork pulled from a bottle (a low-pitch pop), at least in Xhosa; whereas the dental click [kǀ] is like English tsk! tsk!, a high-pitched sucking on the incisors. The lateral clicks are pronounced by sucking on the molars of one or both sides. The labial click [kʘ] is different from what many people associate with a kiss: the lips are pressed more-or-less flat together, as they are for a [p] or an [m], not rounded as they are for a [w].

The most populous languages with clicks, Zulu and Xhosa, use the letters c, q, x, by themselves and in digraphs, to write click consonants. Most Khoisan languages, on the other hand (with the notable exceptions of Naro and Sandawe), use a more iconic system based on the pipe ⟨|⟩. (The exclamation point for the "retroflex" click was originally a pipe with a subscript dot, along the lines of ṭ, ḍ, ṇ used to transcribe the retroflex consonants of India.) There are also two main conventions for the second letter of the digraph as well: voicing may be written with g and uvular affrication with x, or voicing with d and affrication with g (a convention of Afrikaans). In two orthographies of Juǀʼhoan, for example, voiced /ᶢǃ/ is written g! or dq, and /ᵏǃ͡χ/ !x or qg. In languages without /ᵏǃ͡χ/, such as Zulu, /ᶢǃ/ may be written gq.

Competing orthographies
	labial	laminal		apical		subapical
	labial	dental	palatal	alveolar	lateral	retroflex
Lepsius (1855)		ǀ	ǀ́	ǀ̣	ǀǀ	
Bantuist	pc	c	v ç tc qc^{b}	q	x	
IPA (1921)		ʇ	ʞ^{a}	ʗ	ʖ	
Doke (1925)		ʇ	🡣	ʗ	ʖ	ψ
Matte & Omark (1984)	ɋ	ʇ	𝼋	ʗ	ʖ	
IPA (1989)	ʘ	ǀ	ǂ	ǃ	ǁ	𝼊

1. ^a ⟨ʞ⟩ was proposed as the IPA letter for a palatal click by Daniel Jones, but it was taken from the 'velar' click letter of the Anthropos alphabet; in his writing Jones called it 'velar', and it was evidently misunderstood as such by other phoneticians, leading them to think that the IPA did not have a letter for palatal clicks. A palatal letter ⟨⟩ was proposed by Clement Doke, and ⟨𝼋⟩ by Beach, to fill the gap. (The former is not supported by Unicode, and is here substituted with an arrow.) Doke and Beach also created dedicated letters for voiced and nasal clicks, but these did not catch on.
2. ^b The labial and palatal clicks do not occur in written Bantu languages. However, the palatal clicks have been romanized in Naron and Juǀʼhõasi, where they have been written ⟨ç⟩ (later ⟨tc⟩) and ⟨qc⟩, respectively. In the 19th century, palatal clicks were sometimes written with the letter ⟨v⟩, which may have been the source of the Doke letter ⟨⟩. In Hadza, the paralinguistic labialized nasal labial click has been written mcw.

There are a few less-well-attested articulations. A reported subapical retroflex articulation ⟨𝼊⟩ in Grootfontein !Kung (Note: ⟨⦀⟩ (a triple pipe) in Doke (1954) and Cole (1966) is an ad hoc phonetic pipe letter for Doke's orthographic click letter ⟨ψ⟩.) turns out to be alveolar with lateral release, ⟨ǃ𐞷⟩; Ekoka !Kung has a fricated alveolar click with an s-like release, provisionally transcribed ⟨ǃ͡s⟩; and Sandawe has a "slapped" alveolar click, provisionally transcribed ⟨ǃ¡⟩ (in turn, the lateral clicks in Sandawe are more abrupt and less noisy than in southern Africa). However, the Khoisan languages are poorly attested, and it is quite possible that, as they become better described, more click articulations will be found.

Formerly when a click consonant was transcribed, two symbols were used, one for each articulation, and connected with a tie bar. This is because a click such as [ɢ͡ǀ] was analysed as a voiced uvular rear articulation [ɢ] pronounced simultaneously with the forward ingressive release [ǀ]. The symbols may be written in either order, depending on the analysis: ⟨ɢ͡ǀ⟩ or ⟨ǀ͡ɢ⟩. However, a tie bar was not often used in practice, and when the manner is tenuis (a simple [k]), it was often omitted as well. That is, ⟨ǂ⟩ = ⟨kǂ⟩ = ⟨ǂk⟩ = ⟨k͡ǂ⟩ = ⟨ǂ͡k⟩. Regardless, elements that do not overlap with the forward release are usually written according to their temporal order: Prenasalisation is always written first (⟨ɴɢ͡ǀ⟩ = ⟨ɴǀ͡ɢ⟩ = ⟨ɴǀ̬⟩), and the non-lingual part of a contour is always written second (⟨k͡ǀʼqʼ⟩ = ⟨ǀ͡kʼqʼ⟩ = ⟨ǀ͡qʼ⟩).

However, it is common to analyse clicks as simplex segments, despite the fact that the front and rear articulations are independent, and to use diacritics to indicate the rear articulation and the accompaniment. At first this tended to be ⟨ᵏǀ, ᶢǀ, ᵑǀ⟩ for ⟨k͡ǀ, ɡ͡ǀ, ŋ͡ǀ⟩, based on the assumption that the rear articulation was velar; but as it has become clear that the rear articulation is often uvular or even pharyngeal even when there is no velar–uvular contrast, voicing and nasalisation diacritics more in keeping with the IPA have started to appear: ⟨ǀ̥, ǀ̬, ǀ̃, ŋǀ̬⟩ for ⟨ᵏǀ, ᶢǀ, ᵑǀ, ŋᶢǀ⟩.

Variation in the transcription of accompaniments
	Tenuis	Aspirated	Voiced	Nasal	Delayed ("uvular")	True uvular
Tie bars	k͡ǀ	k͡ǀʰ	ɡ͡ǀ	ŋ͡ǀ	ǀ͡k, ǀ͡kʰ, ǀ͡ɡ, ǀ͡ŋ	q͡ǀ, ǀ͡q etc.
Tie bars	k͜ǀ	k͜ǀʰ	ɡ͜ǀ	ŋ͜ǀ	ǀ͜k, ǀ͜kʰ, ǀ͜ɡ, ǀ͜ŋ	q͜ǀ, ǀ͜q etc.
Digraphs	kǀ	kǀʰ	ɡǀ	ŋǀ	ǀk, ǀkʰ, ǀɡ, ǀŋ	qǀ, ǀq etc.
Superscripts	ᵏǀ	ᵏǀʰ	ᶢǀ	ᵑǀ	ǀᵏ, ǀᵏʰ, ǀᶢ, ǀᵑ	𐞥ǀ, ǀ𐞥 etc.
Diacritics	ǀ̥	ǀʰ	ǀ̬	ǀ̬̃	NA	NA

In practical orthography, the voicing or nasalisation is sometimes given the anterior place of articulation: dc for ᶢǀ and mʘ for ᵑʘ, for example.

In the literature on Damin, the clicks are transcribed by adding ⟨!⟩ to the homorganic nasal: ⟨m!, nh!, n!, rn!⟩.

== Places of articulation ==
Places of articulation are often called click types, releases, or influxes, though 'release' is also used for the accompaniment/efflux. There are seven or eight known places of articulation, not counting slapped or egressive clicks. These are (bi)labial affricated ʘ, or "bilabial"; laminal denti-alveolar affricated ǀ, or "dental"; apical (post)alveolar plosive ǃ, or "alveolar"; laminal palatal plosive ǂ, or "palatal"; laminal palatal affricated ǂᶴ (known only from Ekoka !Kung); subapical postalveolar 𝼊, or "retroflex" (only known from Central !Kung and possibly Damin); and apical (post)alveolar lateral ǁ, or "lateral".

Place of articulation of initial release
Labial	Dental	Alveolar	Slapped	Retroflex	Domed	Palatal	Lateral	Linguolabial	Velar
ʘ	ǀ	ǃ	ǃ¡	𝼊	ǂᶴ (𝼋)	ǂ	ǁ	ǀ̼	ʞ
ʘ	ǀ	ǃ	(allophonic)	𝼊	ǂᶴ (𝼋)	ǂ	ǁ	(paralexical only)	

Languages illustrating each of these articulations are listed below. Given the poor state of documentation of Khoisan languages, it is quite possible that additional places of articulation will turn up. No language is known to contrast more than five.

Click place inventory	Languages	Notes
1 release, variable ǀ ~ ǁ	Dahalo	Various nasal clicks only.
1 release, variable ǀ ~ ǃ	Sotho, Swazi	In Sotho the clicks tend to be alveolar, in Swazi dental.
1 release, variable ǀ ~ ǃ ~ ǁ or ǂ	Fwe, Gciriku	Tend to be dental.
3 releases, ǀ, ǂ, ǁ	Kwadi	ǂ and ǁ not found with all manners, but these may be accidental gaps, as Kwadi is poorly attested
3 releases, ǀ, ǃ, ǁ	Sandawe, Hadza, Xhosa, Zulu	In Sandawe, ǃ is often "slapped" [ǃ¡].
3–4 releases, ʘ, ǀ, (ǃ,) ǁ	ǁXegwi	ǃ reacquired in loans
4 releases, ǀ, ǂ, ǃ, ǁ	Korana, Khoekhoe, Yeyi, Juǀʼhoan	
4 releases, ǀ, ǂᶴ, ǃ, ǁ	Ekoka !Kung	
5 releases, ʘ, ǀ, ǂ, ǃ, ǁ	ǂHõã, Nǀu, ǀXam, Taa	
5 releases, ǀ, ǂ, ǃ, 𝼊, ǁ	Grootfontein !Kung	
5 releases, ʘ, ʘ↑, ǀ, ǃ, 𝼊	Damin	Aside from /ʘ↑/, which is not technically a click, all are nasal.

Extra-linguistically, Coatlán Zapotec of Mexico uses a linguolabial click, [ǀ̼ʔ], as mimesis for a pig drinking water, and several languages, such as Wolof, use a velar click [ʞ], long judged to be physically impossible, for backchanneling and to express approval. An extended dental click with lip pursing or compression ("sucking-teeth"), variable in sound and sometimes described as intermediate between [ǀ] and [ʘ], is found across West Africa, the Caribbean and into the United States.

The exact place of the alveolar clicks varies between languages. The lateral, for example, is alveolar in Khoekhoe but postalveolar or even palatal in Sandawe; the central is alveolar in Nǀuu but postalveolar in Juǀʼhoan.

=== Names found in the literature ===
The terms for the click types were originally developed by Bleek in 1862. Since then there has been some conflicting variation. However, apart from "cerebral" (retroflex), which was found to be an inaccurate label when true retroflex clicks were discovered, Bleek's terms are still considered normative today. Here are the terms used in some of the main references.

Names in the literature
Click type	Bleek (1862)	Doke (1926)	IPA (1928)	Beach (1938)	IPA (1949)	IPA (1989)	Unicode	Miller et al. (2009)	Vossen (2013)	other
ǀ	dental	dental	dental	dental affricative	dental	dental	dental	denti-pharyngeal	dental	alveolar affricated; denti-alveolar; apico-lamino-dental
ǃ	cerebral	palato-alveolar	cerebral	alveolar implosive	retroflex	(post-)alveolar	retroflex	central alveo-uvular	alveolar	palatal; palatal retroflex; apico-palatal
ǁ	lateral	lateral	alveolar lateral	lateral affricative	lateral	(alveolar) lateral	lateral	lateral alveo-uvular	lateral-alveolar	post-alveolar lateral; lateral apico-alveo-palatal
ǂ	palatal	alveolar	velar	denti-alveolar implosive	velar	palatoalveolar	alveolar	palato-pharyngeal	palatal	alveolar instantaneous; dental
ʘ						bilabial	bilabial	labio-uvular	bilabial	labial

The dental, lateral and bilabial clicks are rarely confused, but the palatal and alveolar clicks frequently have conflicting names in older literature, and non-standard terminology is fossilized in Unicode. However, since Ladefoged & Traill (1984) clarified the places of articulation, the terms listed under Vossen (2013) in the table above have become standard, apart from such details as whether in a particular language ǃ and ǁ are alveolar or postalveolar, or whether the rear articulation is velar, uvular or pharyngeal, which again varies between languages (or may even be contrastive within a language).

== Manners of articulation ==
Click manners are often called click accompaniments or effluxes, but both terms have met with objections on theoretical grounds.

There is a great variety of click manners, both simplex and complex, the latter variously analysed as consonant clusters or contours. With so few click languages, and so little study of them, it is also unclear to what extent clicks in different languages are equivalent. For example, the [ǃkˀ] of Khoekhoe, [ǃkˀ ~ ŋˀǃk] of Sandawe and [ŋ̊ǃˀ ~ ŋǃkˀ] of Hadza may be essentially the same phone; no language distinguishes them, and the differences in transcription may have more to do with the approach of the linguist than with actual differences in the sounds. Such suspected allophones/allographs are listed on a common row in the table below.

Some Khoisan languages are typologically unusual in allowing mixed voicing in non-click consonant clusters/contours, such as ̬d̥sʼk͡x, so it is not surprising that they would allow mixed voicing in clicks as well. This may be an effect of epiglottalised voiced consonants, because voicing is incompatible with epiglottalisation.

=== Phonation ===
As do other consonants, clicks vary in phonation. Oral clicks are attested with four phonations: tenuis, aspirated, voiced and breathy voiced (murmured). Nasal clicks may also vary, with plain voiced, breathy voiced / murmured nasal, aspirated and unaspirated voiceless clicks attested (the last only in Taa). The aspirated nasal clicks are often said to have 'delayed aspiration'; there is nasal airflow throughout the click, which may become voiced between vowels, though the aspiration itself is voiceless. A few languages also have pre-glottalised nasal clicks, which have very brief prenasalisation but have not been phonetically analysed to the extent that other types of clicks have.

All languages have nasal clicks (apart from Seidel's account of Yeyi), and all but Dahalo and Damin also have oral clicks. All languages but Damin have at least one phonation contrast as well.

=== Secondary articulation ===
Besides pharyngealized clicks, found in a number of Khoisan languages, labialized clicks are found among Bantu languages, and are reconstructed for Proto-Kxʼa. A palatalized click ⟨mqya⟩ [m̩ǃʲa] is provided for by the Mwangwego script for Malawian Ngoni.

=== Complex clicks ===
Clicks may be pronounced with a third place of articulation, glottal. A glottal stop is made during the hold of the click; the (necessarily voiceless) click is released, and then the glottal hold is released into the vowel. Glottalised clicks are very common, and they are generally nasalised as well. The nasalisation cannot be heard during the click release, as there is no pulmonic airflow, and generally not at all when the click occurs at the beginning of an utterance, but it has the effect of nasalising preceding vowels, to the extent that the glottalised clicks of Sandawe and Hadza are often described as prenasalised when in medial position. Two languages, Gǀwi and Yeyi, contrast plain and nasal glottalised clicks, but in languages without such a contrast, the glottalised click is nasal. Miller (2011) analyses the glottalisation as phonation, and so considers these to be simple clicks.

Various languages also have prenasalised clicks, which may be analysed as consonant sequences. Sotho, for example, allows a syllabic nasal before its three clicks, as in nnqane 'the other side' (prenasalised nasal) and seqhenqha 'hunk'.

There is ongoing discussion as to how the distinction between what were historically described as 'velar' and 'uvular' clicks is best described. The 'uvular' clicks are only found in some languages, and have an extended pronunciation that suggests that they are more complex than the simple ('velar') clicks, which are found in all. Nakagawa (1996) describes the extended clicks in Gǀwi as consonant clusters, sequences equivalent to English st or pl, whereas Miller (2011) analyses similar sounds in several languages as click–non-click contours, where a click transitions into a pulmonic or ejective articulation within a single segment, analogous to how English ch and j transition from occlusive to fricative but still behave as unitary sounds. With ejective clicks, for example, Miller finds that although the ejective release follows the click release, it is the rear closure of the click that is ejective, not an independently articulated consonant. That is, in a simple click, the release of the rear articulation is not audible, whereas in a contour click, the rear (uvular) articulation is audibly released after the front (click) articulation, resulting in a double release.

These contour clicks may be linguo-pulmonic, that is, they may transition from a click (lingual) articulation to a normal pulmonic consonant like [ɢ] (e.g. [ǀ͡ɢ]); or linguo-glottalic and transition from lingual to an ejective consonant like [qʼ] (e.g. [ǀ͡qʼ]): that is, a sequence of ingressive (lingual) release + egressive (pulmonic or glottalic) release. In some cases there is a shift in place of articulation as well, and instead of a uvular release, the uvular click transitions to a velar or epiglottal release (depending on the description, [ǂ͡kxʼ] or [ǂᴴ]). Although homorganic [ǂ͡χʼ] does not contrast with heterorganic [ǂ͡kxʼ] in any known language, they are phonetically quite distinct (Miller 2011).

Implosive clicks, i.e. velar [ɠ͡ʘ ɠ͡ǀ ɠ͡ǃ ɠ͡ǂ ɠ͡ǁ], uvular [ʛ͡ʘ ʛ͡ǀ ʛ͡ǃ ʛ͡ǂ ʛ͡ǁ], and de facto front-closed palatal [ʄ͡ʘ ʄ͡ǀ ʄ͡ǃ ʄ͡ǁ] are not only possible but easier to produce than modally voiced clicks. However, they are not attested in any language.

The 'Khoisan' languages, as well as Bantu Yeyi, have glottalized nasal clicks. Contour clicks are restricted to southern Africa, but are very common there: they are found in all members of the Tuu, Kxʼa and Khoe families, as well as in the Bantu language Yeyi.

=== Variation among languages ===
In a comparative study of clicks across various languages, using her own field work as well as phonetic descriptions and data by other field researchers, Miller (2011) posits 21 types of clicks that contrast in manner or airstream. (Note: Not counting the egressive "spurt" in Damin, and three additional voiced manners in Western ǃXoo, which pair up with voiceless manners.) The homorganic and heterorganic affricated ejective clicks do not contrast in any known language, but are judged dissimilar enough to keep separate. Miller's conclusions differ from those of the primary researcher of a language; see the individual languages for details.

- Taa (ǃXóõ) and Nǁng (Nǀuu) are Tuu languages, from the two branches of that family.
- ǂʼAmkoe (ǂHoan) and Juǀʼhoan (ǃKung) are Kxʼa languages, from the two branches of that family.
- Korana and Gǀui (Gǁana) are Khoe languages, from the two branches of that family.

(all spoken primarily in South Africa, Namibia and Botswana; Khoekhoe is similar to Korana except it has lost ejective /ᵏꞰ͡χʼ/)

- Sandawe and Hadza are language isolates spoken in Tanzania
- Dahalo is a Cushitic language of Kenya
- Xhosa and Yeyi are Bantu languages, from the two geographic areas of that family that have acquired clicks.

(Zulu is similar to Xhosa apart from not having /ᵑꞰˀ/)

- Damin was an initiation jargon in northern Australia.

Each language below is illustrated with Ʞ as a placeholder for the different click types. Under each language are the orthography (in italics, with old forms in parentheses), the researchers' transcription (in ⟨angle brackets⟩), or allophonic variation (in [brackets]). Some languages also have labialised or prenasalised clicks in addition to those listed below.

Language			Tuu		Kxʼa		Khoe		Sandawe	Hadza	Cushitic	Bantu		Australian
Language			Taa	Nǁng	ǂʼAmkoe	Juǀʼhoan (Note: Ekoka ǃKung has an additional manner, ˀᵑꞰ. Grootfontein and Mangetti Dune ǃKung, on the other hand, have a substantially smaller inventory: ᵏꞰ, ᶢꞰ, Ʞʰ, ᵑꞰ, ᵑ̊Ʞʱ, ᵑꞰˀ, Ʞ͡χ, Ʞ͡kxʼ.)	Korana	Gǀui	Sandawe	Hadza	Dahalo	Xhosa	Yeyi	Damin
Manner			ʘ, ǂ, ǃ, ǁ, ǀ			ǂ, ǃ, ǁ, ǀ			ǃ, ǁ, ǀ		ǀ	ǃ, ǁ, ǀ	ǂ, ǃ, ǁ, ǀ	ʘ, 𝼊, ǃ, ǀ
Simple oral click	Tenuis	/ᵏꞰ/	⟨Ʞ⟩*	⟨Ʞ⟩	[ᵏꞰ]	Ʞ (c, ç, q, x)	Ʞg	⟨kꞰ⟩	c, q, x	c, q, x (Ʞ)		c, q, x	⟨Ʞ⟩	
Simple oral click	Voiced	/ᶢꞰ/	⟨gꞰ⟩*	⟨ᶢꞰ⟩	[ᶢꞰ]	gꞰ (dq etc.)		⟨gꞰ⟩	gq etc. [ᶢꞰ ~ ŋᶢꞰ]				⟨gꞰ⟩	
Simple oral click	Aspirated	/ᵏꞰʰ/	⟨Ʞh⟩*	⟨Ʞʰ⟩	[ᵏꞰʰ]	Ʞh (qh etc.)	Ʞkh	⟨kꞰh⟩	qh etc.	qh etc. (Ʞh)		qh etc.	⟨Ʞh⟩ (= Ʞx ?)	
Simple oral click	Breathy-voiced	/ᶢꞰʱ/	⟨gꞰh⟩*			gꞰh (dqh etc.) [ᶢꞰʱ ~ ᶢꞰˠ]						gq etc. (Note: Perhaps better described as slack voice. Tone-depressor effect.)		
Simple nasal click	Voiceless	/ᵑ̊Ʞ/	⟨nhꞰ⟩* [ŋ̊ᵑꞰ]											
Simple nasal click	Voiced	/ᵑꞰ/	⟨nꞰ⟩* [ŋ̈ᵑꞰ]	⟨ᵑꞰ⟩	[ᵑꞰ]	nꞰ (nq etc.)	Ʞn	⟨ŋꞰ⟩	nq etc.	nq etc. (nꞰ)	/ᵑǀ/	nq etc.	⟨ŋꞰ⟩	⟨Nǃ⟩
Simple nasal click	(Delayed) aspiration (prenasalised between vowels)	/ᵑ̊Ʞʰʱ/	⟨Ʞhh⟩ [ŋ̊↓Ʞh]	⟨ᵑ̊Ʞʰ⟩	[ᵑ̊Ʞʱ ~ ŋᵑ̊Ʞʱ]	Ʞʼh (qʼh etc.)	Ʞh	⟨ŋꞰh⟩						
Simple nasal click	Breathy-voiced	/ᵑꞰʱ/	⟨nꞰhh⟩			nꞰh (nqh etc.)						ngq etc. (Note: Tone-depressor effect. Sometimes a prenasalized click with a short, voiced oral occlusion, but usually without.)		
Preglottalised nasal click		/ˀᵑꞰ/	⟨ʼnꞰ⟩*		[ʔᵑꞰ]	(in Ekoka)								
Glottalised click	Oral / velar ejective	/ᵏꞰʼ/	⟨Ʞʼ⟩*					⟨kꞰʼ⟩					⟨Ʞʼ⟩	
Glottalised click	Creaky-voiced oral	/ᶢꞰʼ/	⟨gꞰʼ⟩*											
Glottalised click	Nasal (silent initially, prenasalised after vowels)	/ᵑ̊Ʞˀ/	⟨Ʞʼʼ⟩	⟨ᵑ̊Ʞˀ⟩	[Ʞˀ ~ ŋˀꞰ]	Ʞʼ (qʼ etc.) (w/ nasal vowels)	Ʞ	⟨kꞰʔ⟩ (ŋ̊Ʞʔ)	qʼ etc. [Ʞˀʔ ~ ŋʔꞰˀ]	qq etc. (Ʞʼ ~ nꞰʼ)	/ᵑǀˀ/	nkq etc. ?	⟨ŋꞰʼ⟩	
Glottalised click	Nasal (prenasalised initially)	/ᵑꞰˀ/	⟨nꞰʼʼ⟩											
Pulmonic contour	Tenuis stop	/Ʞ͡q/	⟨Ʞq⟩	⟨Ʞq⟩	[Ʞq]			⟨qꞰ⟩						
Pulmonic contour	Voiced (and prenasalised)	/ᶢꞰ͡ɢ/	⟨gꞰq⟩ [ᶰꞰɢ ~ Ʞɢ]	[Ʞɢ] (Note: not prenasalized)	([ᶰꞰɢ]) (Note: perhaps borrowed from Gǀui)			⟨ɢꞰ⟩ [ᶰꞰɢ]						
Pulmonic contour	Aspirated stop	/Ʞ͡qʰ/	⟨Ʞqh⟩	⟨Ʞqʰ⟩	[Ʞqʰ]			⟨qꞰh⟩						
Pulmonic contour	Breathy-voiced	/ᶢꞰ͡ɢʱ/	⟨gꞰqh⟩											
Pulmonic contour	Voiceless fricative	/ᵏꞰ͡χ/	⟨Ʞx⟩	⟨Ʞχ⟩	[Ʞq͡χ]	Ʞx (qg etc.)		⟨qꞰχ⟩					⟨Ʞx⟩ (?)	
Pulmonic contour	Voiced fricative (prenasalised)	/ᶢꞰ͡ʁ/	⟨gꞰx⟩ [ᶢꞰ͡χ ~ ɴᶢꞰ͡ʁ]			gꞰx (dqg etc.)								
Ejective contour	Ejective stop	/Ʞ͡qʼ/	⟨Ʞqʼ⟩	[Ʞqʼ]	[Ʞqʼ]			⟨qꞰʼ⟩						
Ejective contour	Voiced ejective stop	/ᶢꞰ͡qʼ/	⟨gꞰqʼ⟩											
Ejective contour	Ejective fricative	/Ʞ͡χʼ/		⟨Ʞχʼ⟩	[Ʞq͡χʼ]		Ʞkhʼ						⟨Ʞqʼ⟩	
Ejective contour	Heterorganic affricate / epiglottalised	/Ʞ͡kxʼ/	⟨Ʞqxʼ⟩			Ʞk (qgʼ etc.) [Ʞᵸ]	Ʞkhʼ	⟨qꞰχʼ⟩						
Ejective contour	Voiced heterorganic affricate / epiglottalised	/ᶢꞰ͡kxʼ/	⟨gꞰqxʼ⟩			gꞰk (dqgʼ etc.) [ᶢꞰˤ]								
Egressive (Note: Not technically a click, but the only other attested sound with a lingual airstream mechanism.)	(Voiceless "spurt"; labial only)	/ʘ↑/												⟨pʼ⟩
		IPA	Taa	Nǁng	ǂʼAmkoe	Juǀʼhoan	Korana	Gǀui	Sandawe	Hadza	Dahalo	Xhosa	Yeyi	Damin

Yeyi also has prenasalised /ŋᶢꞰ/. The original researchers believe that [Ʞʰ] and [Ʞχ] are allophones.

A DoBeS (2008) study of the Western ǃXoo dialect of Taa found several new manners: creaky voiced (the voiced equivalent of glottalised oral), breathy-voiced nasal, prenasalised glottalised (the voiced equivalent of glottalised) and a (pre)voiced ejective. These extra voiced clicks reflect Western ǃXoo morphology, where many nouns form their plural by voicing their initial consonant. DoBeS analyses most Taa clicks as clusters, leaving nine basic manners (marked with asterisks in the table). This comes close to Miller's distinction between simple and contour clicks, shaded light and medium grey in the table.

== Phonotactics ==
Languages of the southern African Khoisan families only permit clicks at the beginning of a word root. However, they also restrict other classes of consonant, such as ejectives and affricates, to root-initial position. The Bantu languages, Hadza and Sandawe allow clicks within roots.

In some languages, all click consonants within known roots are the same phoneme, as in Hadza cikiringcingca /ǀikiɺiN.ǀiN.ǀa/ 'pinkie finger', which has three tenuis dental clicks. Other languages are known to have the occasional root with different clicks, as in Xhosa ugqwanxa /uᶢ̊ǃʱʷaᵑǁa/ 'black ironwood', which has a slack-voiced alveolar click and a nasal lateral click.

No natural language allows clicks at the ends of syllables or words, but then no languages with clicks allows many consonants at all in those positions. Similarly, clicks are not found in underlying consonant clusters apart from /Cw/ (and, depending on the analysis, /Cχ/), as languages with clicks do not have other consonant clusters than that. Due to vowel elision, however, there are cases where clicks are pronounced in cross-linguistically common types of consonant clusters, such as Xhosa [sᵑǃɔɓilɛ] Snqobile, from Sinqobile (a name), and [isǁʰɔsa] isXhosa, from isiXhosa (the Xhosa language).

Like other articulatorily complex consonants, clicks tend to be found in lexical words rather than in grammatical words, but this is only a tendency. In Nǁng, for example, there are two sets of personal pronouns, a full one without clicks and a partial set with clicks (ńg 'I', á 'thou', í 'we all', ú 'you', vs. nǀǹg 'I', gǀà 'thou', gǀì 'we all', gǀù 'you'), as well as other grammatical words with clicks such as ǁu 'not' and nǀa 'with, and'.

=== The back-vowel constraint ===
The shape of the tongue in Khoekhoe when articulating an alveolar click (blue) and a palatal click (red) [throat to the right]. The articulation of the vowel [i] is slightly forward of the red line, with its peak coinciding with the dip of the blue line.

In several languages, including Khoekhoe and Juǀʼhoan, the alveolar click types [ǃ] and [ǁ] only occur, or preferentially occur, before back vowels, whereas the dental and palatal clicks occur before any vowel. The effect is most noticeable with the high front vowel [i]. In Khoekhoe, for example, the diphthong [əi] is common but [i] is rare after alveolar clicks, whereas the opposite is true after dental and palatal clicks. This is a common effect of uvular or uvularised consonants on vowels in both click and non-click languages. In Taa, for example, the back-vowel constraint is triggered by both alveolar clicks and uvular stops, but not by palatal clicks or velar stops: sequences such as */ǃi/ and */qi/ are rare to non-existent, whereas sequences such as /ǂi/ and /ki/ are common. The back-vowel constraint is also triggered by labial clicks, though not by labial stops. Clicks subject to this constraint involve a sharp retraction of the tongue during release.

	Abrupt release	Noisy release
Ballistic tongue retraction & back-vowel constraint	ǃ	ǁ, ʘ
No retraction, no constraint	ǂ	ǀ

Miller and colleagues (2003) used ultrasound imaging to show that the rear articulation of the alveolar clicks ([ǃ]) in Khoekhoe is substantially different from that of palatal and dental clicks. Specifically, the shape of the body of the tongue in palatal clicks is very similar to that of the vowel [i], and involves the same tongue muscles, so that sequences such as [ǂi] involved a simple and quick transition. The rear articulation of the alveolar clicks, however, is several centimetres further back, and involves a different set of muscles in the uvular region. The part of the tongue required to approach the palate for the vowel [i] is deeply retracted in [ǃ], as it lies at the bottom of the air pocket used to create the vacuum required for click airstream. This makes the transition required for [ǃi] much more complex and the timing more difficult than the shallower and more forward tongue position of the palatal clicks. Consequently, [ǃi] takes 50 ms longer to pronounce than [ǂi], the same amount of time required to pronounce [ǃəi].

Languages do not all behave alike. In Nǀuu, the simple clicks /ʘ, ǃ, ǁ/ trigger the [əi] and [æ] allophones of /i/ and /e/, whereas /ǀ, ǂ/ do not. All of the affricated contour clicks, such as /ǂ͡χ/, do as well, as do the uvular stops /q, χ/. However, the occlusive contour clicks pattern like the simple clicks, and /ǂ͡q/ does not trigger the back-vowel constraint. This is because they involve tongue-root raising rather than tongue-root retraction in the uvular-pharyngeal region. However, in Gǀwi, which is otherwise largely similar, both /ǂ͡q/ and /ǂ͡χ/ trigger the back-vowel constraint (Miller 2009).

== Click genesis and click loss ==
One genetic study concluded that clicks, which occur in the languages of the genetically divergent populations Hadza and !Kung, may be an ancient element of human language. However, this conclusion relies on several dubious assumptions (see Hadza language), and most linguists assume that clicks, being quite complex consonants, arose relatively late in human history. How they arose is not known, but it is generally assumed that they developed from sequences of non-click consonants, as they are found allophonically for doubly articulated consonants in West Africa, for /tk/ sequences that overlap at word boundaries in German, and for the sequence /mw/ in Ndau and Tonga. (Note: Here the labial [m] may have assimilated to the velar place of the [w], as [m͡ŋw], with the release of the labial before the velar later generating a click [ᵐʘw]) Such developments have also been posited in historical reconstruction. For example, the Sandawe word for 'horn', /tɬana/, with a lateral affricate, may be a cognate with the root /ᵑǁaː/ found throughout the Khoe family, which has a lateral click. This and other words suggests that at least some Khoe clicks may have formed from consonant clusters when the first vowel of a word was lost; in this instance *[tɬana] > *[tɬna] > [ǁŋa] ~ [ᵑǁa].

On the other side of the equation, several non-endangered languages in vigorous use demonstrate click loss. For example, the East Kalahari languages have lost clicks from a large percentage of their vocabulary, presumably due to Bantu influence. As a rule, a click is replaced by a consonant with close to the manner of articulation of the click and the place of articulation of the forward release: alveolar click releases (the [ǃ] family) tend to mutate into a velar stop or affricate, such as [k], [ɡ], [ŋ], [k͡x]; palatal clicks (the [ǂ] family) tend to mutate into a palatal stop such as [c], [ ɟ], [ ɲ], [cʼ], or a post-alveolar affricate [tʃ], [dʒ]; and dental clicks (the [ǀ] family) tend to mutate into an alveolar affricate [ts].

== Difficulty ==
Clicks are often presented as difficult sounds to articulate within words. However, children acquire them readily; a two-year-old, for example, may be able to pronounce a word with a lateral click [ǁ] with no problem, but still be unable to pronounce [s]. Lucy Lloyd reported that after long contact with the Khoi and San, it was difficult for her to refrain from using clicks when speaking English.

== See also ==
- Bilabial clicks
- Dental clicks
- Alveolar clicks
- Fricated alveolar clicks
- Lateral clicks
- Retroflex clicks
- Palatal clicks
- Back-released click
- Nasal clicks
- Glottalised clicks
- Pulmonic-contour clicks
- Ejective-contour clicks
- Click letters
- List of phonetics topics
- Sublaminal lower alveolar click
- Clicking noise
- The Click Song

== Bibliography ==
- Ladefoged, Peter (1968). A phonetic study of West African languages: An auditory-instrumental survey (2nd ed.). Cambridge University Press. ISBN 0-521-06963-7.
- Ladefoged, Peter; Maddieson, Ian (1996). The Sounds of the World's Languages. Oxford: Blackwell. ISBN 0-631-19815-6.
- Miller, Amanda; Namaseb, Levi; Iskarous, Khalil (2003). Tongue Body constriction differences in click types.
- Miller, Amanda (2011). "The Representation of Clicks". In Oostendorp (ed.). The Blackwell Companion to Phonology.
- Traill, Anthony; Vossen, Rainer (1997). "Sound change in the Khoisan languages: new data on click loss and click replacement". J African Languages and Linguistics. 18 (1): 21–56. doi:10.1515/jall.1997.18.1.21.

Place →	Labial					Coronal										Dorsal					Laryngeal			
Manner ↓	Bilabial		Labiodental		Linguolabial		Dental		Alveolar		Postalveolar		Retroflex		(Alveolo-)palatal		Velar		Uvular		Pharyngeal/epiglottal		Glottal	
Nasal	m̥	m	ɱ̊	ɱ		n̼	n̪̊	n̪	n̥	n	n̠̊	n̠	ɳ̊	ɳ	ɲ̊	ɲ	ŋ̊	ŋ	ɴ̥	ɴ				
Plosive	p	b	p̪	b̪	t̼	d̼	t̪	d̪	t	d			ʈ	ɖ	c	ɟ	k	ɡ	q	ɢ	ʡ		ʔ	
Sibilant affricate							ts̪	dz̪	ts	dz	tʃ	dʒ	tʂ	dʐ	tɕ	dʑ								
Non-sibilant affricate	pɸ	bβ	p̪f	b̪v			tθ	dð	tɹ̝̊	dɹ̝	t̠ɹ̝̊	d̠ɹ̝			cç	ɟʝ	kx	ɡɣ	qχ	ɢʁ	ʡʜ	ʡʢ	ʔh	
Sibilant fricative							s̪	z̪	s	z	ʃ	ʒ	ʂ	ʐ	ɕ	ʑ								
Non-sibilant fricative	ɸ	β	f	v	θ̼	ð̼	θ	ð	θ̠	ð̠	ɹ̝̠̊	ɹ̠᷵	ɻ̥᷵	ɻ᷵	ç	ʝ	x	ɣ	χ	ʁ	ħ	ʕ	h	ɦ
Approximant		β̞		ʋ				ð̞		ɹ		ɹ̠		ɻ		j		ɰ						˷
Tap/flap		ⱱ̟		ⱱ					ɾ̥	ɾ			ɽ̊	ɽ						ɢ̆		ʡ̆		
Trill	ʙ̥	ʙ							r̥	r		r̠	ɽ̊r̥	ɽr					ʀ̥	ʀ	ʜ	ʢ		
Lateral affricate									tɬ	dɮ			tꞎ	d𝼅	c𝼆	ɟʎ̝	k𝼄	ɡʟ̝						
Lateral fricative							ɬ̪		ɬ	ɮ			ꞎ	𝼅	𝼆	ʎ̝	𝼄	ʟ̝						
Lateral approximant								l̪	l̥	l		l̠	ɭ̊	ɭ	ʎ̥	ʎ	ʟ̥	ʟ		ʟ̠				
Lateral tap/flap									ɺ̥	ɺ			𝼈̊	𝼈		ʎ̆		ʟ̆						

		BL	LD	D	A	PA	RF	P	V	U
Implosive	Voiced	ɓ			ɗ		ᶑ	ʄ	ɠ	ʛ
Implosive	Voiceless	ɓ̥			ɗ̥		ᶑ̊	ʄ̊	ɠ̊	ʛ̥
Ejective	Stop	pʼ			tʼ		ʈʼ	cʼ	kʼ	qʼ
Ejective	Affricate		p̪fʼ	tθʼ	tsʼ	tʃʼ	tʂʼ	tɕʼ	kxʼ	qχʼ
Ejective	Fricative	ɸʼ	fʼ	θʼ	sʼ	ʃʼ	ʂʼ	ɕʼ	xʼ	χʼ
Ejective	Lateral affricate				tɬʼ			c𝼆ʼ	k𝼄ʼ	q𝼄ʼ
Ejective	Lateral fricative				ɬʼ					
Click (top: velar; bottom: uvular)	Tenuis	kʘ qʘ		kǀ qǀ	kǃ qǃ		k𝼊 q𝼊	kǂ qǂ		
Click (top: velar; bottom: uvular)	Voiced	ɡʘ ɢʘ		ɡǀ ɢǀ	ɡǃ ɢǃ		ɡ𝼊 ɢ𝼊	ɡǂ ɢǂ		
Click (top: velar; bottom: uvular)	Nasal	ŋʘ ɴʘ		ŋǀ ɴǀ	ŋǃ ɴǃ		ŋ𝼊 ɴ𝼊	ŋǂ ɴǂ	ʞ	
Click (top: velar; bottom: uvular)	Tenuis lateral				kǁ qǁ					
Click (top: velar; bottom: uvular)	Voiced lateral				ɡǁ ɢǁ					
Click (top: velar; bottom: uvular)	Nasal lateral				ŋǁ ɴǁ					
