= Mbukushu language =

Bantu language spoken in southern Africa

Mbukushu
- Thimbukushu
- Native to: Namibia, Angola, Botswana, Zambia
- Region: Kavango East
- Native speakers: 95,000 (2020)
- Language family: Niger–Congo?: Atlantic–Congo; Benue–Congo; Southern Bantoid; Bantu (Zone K); Mbukushu

Language codes
- ISO 639-3: mhw
- Glottolog: mbuk1240
- Guthrie code: K.333

Mbukushu or Thimbukushu is a Bantu language spoken by 45,000 people along the Kavango East Region in Namibia, where it is a national language, and in Botswana, Angola and Zambia.

In 2022, it was selected among a variety of Mother Tongue languages to be taught in Botswana Primary Schools in the year 2023.

== Phonology ==
=== Consonants ===
		Labial	Dental	Alveolar	Post-alv./ Palatal	Velar	Glottal
Click	voiceless		ᵏǀ				
Click	voiced		ᶢǀ				
Click	prenasal vl.		ᵑǀᵏ				
Click	prenasal vd.		ᵑǀᶢ				
Nasal		m		n	ɲ	ŋ	
Plosive/ Affricate	voiceless	p	t̪	t	tʃ	k	
Plosive/ Affricate	voiced	b		d	dʒ	ɡ	
Plosive/ Affricate	prenasal	ᵐb	ⁿd̪	ⁿd	ⁿdʒ	ᵑɡ	
Fricative	voiceless	f	θ	(s)	ʃ		h
Fricative	voiced	v	ð	(z)		ɣ	
Fricative	nasal	ᶬv	ⁿð				h̃
Approximant					j	w	
Trill				r			

- /s, z/ are only found in loanwords.
- /j/ may also be heard as a palatal fricative [ʝ].
- Clicks may also range to being alveolar [ᵏǃ, ᶢǃ, ᵑǃᵏ, ᵑǃᶢ] or palatal [ᵏǂ, ᶢǂ, ᵑǂᵏ, ᵑǂᶢ].

Mbukushu is one of several Bantu languages of the Kavango which have click consonants; Mbukushu has three: tenuis c, voiced gc, and nasalized nc, as well as prenasalized ngc, which vary between speakers as dental, palatal, and postalveolar. It also has a nasal glottal approximant.

=== Vowels ===
	Front	Central	Back
High	i		u
Mid	ɛ		ɔ
Low		a	
