= Khoemana =

Khoe language of South Africa

- Griqua, Korana, ǃOra, Kora, Xri
- ǃOrakobab
- Native to: South Africa, Namibia
- Ethnicity: Griqua people
- Native speakers: Korana: 3 (2023); Xiri: 187 (2008)
- Language family: Khoe–Kwadi: Khoe; Khoekhoe; Khoemana
- Dialects: Korana; Xiri

Language codes
- ISO 639-3: Either: kqz – Korana xii – Xiri
- Glottolog: sout3214
- ELP: Korana

ǃOrakobab, or Khoemana, also known as Korana, ǃOra, Xri and Griqua, is a moribund Khoe language of South Africa.

== Names ==
"Khoemana" (from khoe 'person' + mana 'language') is more commonly known as either Korana /kɒˈrɑːnə/ korr-AH-nə (also ǃOrakobab, ǃOra, Kora, Koraqua) or Griqua (also Gri [xri], Xri, Xiri, Xirikwa). (Note: The -kwa is also a grammatical suffix. The letter "g" for the sound [x] reflects Afrikaans orthography) The name 'Korana' reflects the endonym ǃOra or ǃGora [kǃoɾa], referring to the ǃOra people. (Note: The -na is a grammatical suffix) Sometimes ǃOra is also known as Cape Khoe or Cape Hottentot, though the latter has become considered derogatory. The various names are often treated as different languages (called South Khoekhoe when taken together), but they do not correspond to any actual dialect distinctions, and speakers may use "Korana" and "Griqua" interchangeably. Both names are also used more broadly, for example for the Griqua people. There exist (or existed) several dialects of Khoemana, but the details are unknown.

== Documentation ==
Robust ǃOrakobab (before more recent language attrition) is principally recorded in an 1879 notebook by Lucy Lloyd, which contains five short stories; some additional work was done in Ponelis (1975). As of 2009, the EuroBABEL project is searching for remaining speakers.

== History ==
The people and their language first began to attract scholarly attention in the 1660s, coinciding with Dutch colonial efforts in the Cape of Good Hope and the resulting armed conflicts. At the time, ǃOrakobab was widely spoken throughout the coastal regions of South Africa. After years of attrition during the colonial era to the 1930s, and under apartheid from 1948 to 1994, the language has all but vanished. Currently, speakers of ǃOrakobab are not only scarce but scattered, due to forced migrations during the apartheid era. This has rendered the language particularly vulnerable.

== Population ==
Reports as to the number of ǃOrakobab speakers are contradictory, but it is clear that it is nearly extinct. It was thought to be extinct until the discovery of four elderly speakers around Bloemfontein and Kimberley. A 2009 report by Don Killian of the University of Helsinki estimated that there were less than 30 speakers at the time. Matthias Brenzinger reported in 2012 that one possible speaker remained, but that she refused to speak the language. The discrepancies could be because the language has multiple dialects and goes by several names, with scholars not always referring to the same population. ǃOrakobab is listed as "critically endangered" in UNESCO's Language Atlas. The loss of this endangered language would have a significant impact on the heritage and culture of ǃOrakobab speakers.

== Phonology ==
ǃOrakobab (Khoemana) is closely related to Khoekhoe, and the sound systems are broadly similar.

=== Vowels ===
ǃOrakobab vowels
	Front		Central	Back	
	oral	nasal	oral	oral	nasal
Close	i	ĩ		u	ũ
Mid	e		ə	o	õ
Open	a	ã			

In Korana, [oe] and [oa] can be pronounced as [we] and [wa].

=== Consonants ===
The strongly aspirated Khoekhoe affricates are simply aspirated plosives [tʰ, kʰ] in ǃOrakobab. However, ǃOrakobab has an ejective velar affricate, /kxʼʔ/, (Note: An ejective velar "scrape" followed by a glottal stop, a bit different from a typical velar ejective affricate) which is not found in Khoekhoe, and a corresponding series of clicks, /ǀ͡xʼ ǁ͡xʼ ǃ͡xʼ ǂ͡xʼ/. Beach (1938) reported that the Khoekhoe of the time had a velar lateral ejective affricate, [k͡ʟ̝̊ʼ], a common realisation or allophone of /kxʼ/ in languages with clicks, and it might be expected that this is true for ǃOrakobab as well. In addition, about half of all lexical words in ǃOrakobab began with a click, compared to a quarter in Khoekhoe.

ǃOrakobab non-click consonants
		Labial	Dental	Alveolar	Velar	Glottal
Nasal		m	n			
Plosive	voiceless	p	t		k	ʔ
Plosive	aspirated		tʰ		kʰ	
Plosive	voiced	b	d		ɡ	
Affricate ejective			tsʼ		kxʼ	
Fricative				s	x	h
Trill				r		

- The phoneme [k] can be realized as /c/ before [e] or [i].
- An intervocalic [p] and [b] are sometimes realized as /β/.
- [s] is stated to be alveolar-postalveolar when not followed by a close front vowel [i], [ĩ], or [e].
- The aspirated phoneme [tʰ] is realized as an affricate sound /ts/ when followed by a close front vowel [i], [ĩ], or [e].
- The aspirated sound [kʰ] can sometimes be realized as [kx]. Some Griqua speakers may pronounce [kʰ] as [kʼ].
- The [tsʼ] sound only seldom occurs.
- [m] and [n] can occur syllabically as [m̩] and [n̩].
- The trilled [r] can also be realized as a flapped [ɾ] in some speech.
- Voicing can be very weak in Khoemana in casual speech, so voiced plosives can be hard to distinguish from voiceless plosives.

==== Clicks ====
ǃOrakobab clicks
	dental	alveolar	lateral	palatal
voiceless	ᵏǀ	ᵏǃ	ᵏǁ	ᵏǂ
nasal	ᵑǀ	ᵑǃ	ᵑǁ	ᵑǂ
glottalized	ǀˀ	ǃˀ	ǁˀ	ǂˀ
aspirated	ǀʰ	ǃʰ	ǁʰ	ǂʰ
voiced	ᶢǀ	ᶢǃ	ᶢǁ	ᶢǂ
aspirated k	ǀᵏʰ	ǃᵏʰ	ǁᵏʰ	ǂᵏʰ
velar affricate	ǀkx	ǃkx	ǁkx	ǂkx
velar ejective affricate	ǀkxʼ	ǃkxʼ	ǁkxʼ	ǂkxʼ
velar fricative	ǀx	ǃx	ǁx	ǂx

There are four tones in ǃOrakobab: high (notated with an acute accent), rising (notated with a caron), mid (no accent), and falling (notated with a circumflex).
