= ǁXegwi language =

Extinct IKwi language of South Africa

ǁXegwi
- ǁXʼegwi
- giǁkxi꞉gwi
- Native to: South Africa
- Region: Lake Chrissie
- Ethnicity: Tlouʼeʼthle
- Extinct: 1988, with the death of Jopi Mabinda
- Language family: Tuu: ǃKwi; Eastern; ǁXegwi

Language codes
- ISO 639-3: xeg
- Glottolog: xegw1238

ǁXegwi or ǁXʼegwi (pronounced /ˈzɛɡwiː/ ZEH-gwee; ǁXegwi: giǁkxi꞉gwi), also known as Batwa, is an extinct ǃKwi language spoken at Lake Chrissie in South Africa, near the Swazi border. The last known speaker, Jopi Mabinda (also Jobi Mabinda), was murdered in 1988. However, a reporter for the South African newspaper Mail & Guardian reports that ǁXʼegwi may still have been spoken in the Chrissiesmeer district in 2011.

The ǁXʼegwi name for their language has been spelled giǁkwi꞉gwi or kiǁkwi꞉gwi. Their name for themselves, Tlouʼeʼthle 'people of rock and water', has been transcribed tlou tle and kxlou-kxle, presumably renderings of [k͡𝼄ouk͡𝼄e]. The Nguni (Zulu and Swazi) called them (a)batwa, amaNkqeshe and amaNgqwigqwi; the Sotho called them Baroa~Barwa.

== Phonology ==
=== Tone ===
From Köhler's material, it appears that ǁXʼegwi had a four-tone inventory.

=== Consonants ===
ǁXʼegwi lost the abrupt clicks (the various manners of ǂ and ǃ) found in its relatives. It reacquired ǃ from Nguni Bantu languages, but clicks remained relatively infrequent, compared to other Tuu languages. It also had a series of uvular plosives not found in other Tuu languages.

Labialized consonants are recorded, both pulmonic and lingual; Honken (2020) interprets [CʷV] as /CoV/.

Pulmonic and ejective consonants
		Labial	Alveolar			Palatal (-alveolar)	Velar	Uvular	Glottal
		Labial	plain	lateral	sibilant	Palatal (-alveolar)	Velar	Uvular	Glottal
Nasal		m	n			ɲ	ŋ		
Plosive/ Affricate	tenuis	p	t		(ts)	tʃ	k	q	ʔ
Plosive/ Affricate	aspirated	pʰ	tʰ	kɬʰ		tʃʰ	kʰ	qʰ	
Plosive/ Affricate	voiced	b	d	dl	dz	dʒ	ɡ	ɢ	
Plosive/ Affricate	ejective		tʼ	kɬʼ	tsʼ	tʃʼ	kxʼ	qʼ	
Plosive/ Affricate	velarized		tx		tsx				
Fricative	voiceless	f		ɬ	s	ʃ	x		h
Fricative	voiced	β			z	ʒ			
Liquid			r	(l)					

/ts/ is a marginal phoneme. /l/ and /f/ are exclusive to loanwords.

Lingual consonants
		Labial	Dental	Alveolar	
		Labial	Dental	median	lateral
Nasal	modal	ᵑʘ	ᵑǀ	ᵑǃ	ᵑǁ
Nasal	glottalized		ᵑǀˀ	ᵑǃˀ	ᵑǁˀ
Nasal	murmured	ᵑʘʱ	ᵑǀʱ	ᵑǃʱ	ᵑǁʱ
Plosive	voiced		ᶢǀ	ᶢǃ	ᶢǁ
Plosive	aspirated		ᵏǀʰ	ᵏǃʰ	ᵏǁʰ
Plosive	tenuis	ᵏʘ	ᵏǀ	ᵏǃ	ᵏǁ
Affricate	tenuis	ᵏʘx	ᵏǀx	ᵏǃx	ᵏǁx
Affricate	ejective	ᵏʘxʼ	ᵏǀxʼ	ᵏǃxʼ	ᵏǁxʼ

=== Vowels ===
There is a great deal of variation between nasal vowels, [Ṽ], and oral vowels with a nasal coda, [Vŋ], so the phonemic status of nasal vowels is unclear. All researchers also transcribe long vowels (not shown):

Modal vowels
	Front		Central		Back	
	oral	nasal	oral	nasal	oral	nasal
Close	i	ĩ			u	ũ
Mid	e	(ẽ)			o	(õ)
Open			a	ã		

Non-modal vowels
	Front		Central		Back	
	oral	nasal	oral	nasal	oral	nasal
Close	ḭ	ḭ̃			ṵ	ṵ̃
Mid	ḛ				o̰	
Open			a̰	ã̰		

The non-modal vowels are transcribed by all researchers as glottalized; Traill (1979) interprets them as pharyngealized as in other Tuu languages. We transcribe them here as creaky voice:

== Syntax ==
=== Word order ===
ǁXʼegwi exhibits subject–verb–object (SVO) word order, as can be seen in the following examples:

ʼi ǀxe tlwa ʼin ʼuye 'we speak a matter now'

ʼn ǀxeya ʼe la giǁkxi꞉gwi 'I speak Bushman'

== Sample text ==
Marriage

ʼi tleŋwe ǀhwi ʼiye ga ʼi ǁhãʼaziye ʼĩ ya.
We kill a bird and we go to lobola with it.

ʼi khwi ʼi tleŋ ǀhuriŋ ʼiye ga ʼi ǁhãʼazi ʼi ya.
(Again) we kill a spur-winged goose to go and lobola by means of it.

ʼĩ se ʼnxǀe ʼe ǁni ki ʼa xwa.
I arrive and enter the house of her mother.

ʼiŋ se ʼŋ gyosi ʼe khëu ǃkʼalo.
I arrive and put (it) down.

ʼŋ ku-ge ha ʼe na ha ǀhuriŋ ki we.
I say: "There is your spur-winged goose, I lobola with it."

yebo-ge han luga-ge ʼa ga ʼuwa ha ʼe na ǁʼeleʼe ʼu tʼãʼãʼũ thã-ge.
"Yes it is good, you may take this child, go well!"
