= Yeyi =

Yeyi may refer to:

- Ye County, Henan, China, formerly known as Yeyi
- Yeyi people
- Yeyi language
