= Khwe language =

Khoe dialect continuum of the Okavango Delta, southwestern Africa

Khwe
- Kxoe, Khwedam
- Native to: Namibia, Angola, Botswana, South Africa, Zambia
- Region: Northwest District in Botswana, Khwai River, Mababe
- Native speakers: 8,000 (2011) (7,000 Khwe and 1,000 ǁAni)
- Language family: Khoe–Kwadi: Khoe; Kalahari (Tshu–Khwe); Northwest; Khwe

Language codes
- ISO 639-3: Either: xuu – Khwe hnh – ǁAni (Handa)
- Glottolog: kxoe1242
- ELP: Khwe; ǁAni
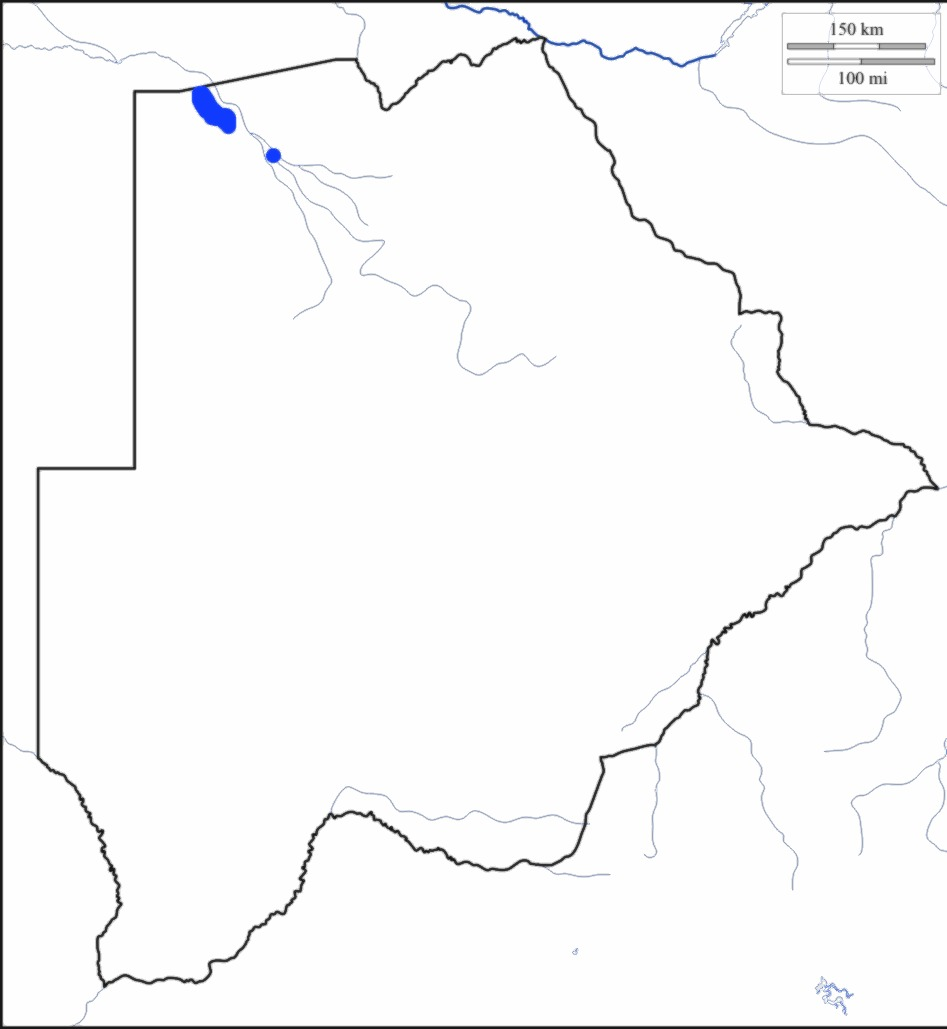

Khwe (/ˈkweɪ/ KWAY; also rendered Kxoe, Khoe /ˈkɔɪ/ KOY and Khwedam) is a dialect continuum of the Khoe branch of the Khoe-Kwadi family of Namibia, Angola, Botswana, South Africa, and parts of Zambia, with some 8,000 speakers.

== Classification ==
Khwe is a member of the Khoe branch of the larger Khoe-Kwadi language family.

In 2000, the meeting of the Working Group of Indigenous Minorities in South Africa (WIMSA) produced the Penduka Declaration on the Standardisation of Ju and Khoe Languages, which recommends Khwe be classified as part of the Central Khoe-San family, a cluster language comprising Khwe, ǁAni and Buga.

Khwe is the preferred spelling as recommended by the Penduka Declaration, but the language is also referred to as Kxoe, Khoe-dam and Khwedam. Barakwena, Barakwengo and Mbarakwena refer to speakers of the language and are considered pejorative.

Other names and spellings of ǁAni include ǀ᪶Anda, Gǀanda, Handá, Gani and Tanne with various combinations of -kwe/khwe/khoe and -dam.

== History ==
The Khwe-speaking population has resided around the "bush" in areas of sub-Saharan Africa for several thousand years. Testimonies from living Khwe speakers note that their ancestors have come from the Tsodilo Hills, in the Okavango Delta, where they primarily used hunter-gatherer techniques for subsistence. These testimonies also indicate that living Khwe speakers feel as though they are land-less, and feel as though the governments of Botswana and Namibia have taken their land and rights to it.

Until the 1970s, the Khwe speaking population lived in areas that were inaccessible to most Westerners in remote parts of Namibia, Angola, Zambia, Botswana, and South Africa. Since then, livelihoods have shifted from primarily from hunter-gatherer to more Westernized practices. The first Bantu-speaking education that Khwe speakers received was in 1970 at a settlement in Mùtcʼiku, a settlement proximate the Okavango River.

Some argue that this put the language in a state of decline, as younger populations learned Bantu languages, such as Tswana. Khwe is learned locally as a second language in Namibia, but the language is being lost in Botswana as speakers shift to Tswana. It is also argued that this has led to a semantic broadening in meaning of words in the Khwe language. For example, "to write", ǁgàràá, was formerly used to describe an "activity the community members perform during healing ceremonies". The semantic broadening of word meanings has also permeated other parts of Khwe-speaking culture, such as food, animals, and other forms of naming that some argue have introduced nonconformity. Noting this, the original meanings of these words is still understood and used during Khwe cultural practices.

While Khwe-speakers were in minimal contact with the outsiders until 1970, there was limited interaction between the Khwe and missionaries in early and mid-twentieth centuries. The missionaries, for the most part, failed to convert the Khwe-speaking population. The introduction to missionaries, however, introduced Western culture and languages, in addition to Bantu languages.

Despite the influence of Bantu languages in Khwe speakers education, historically, Khwe, and other Khoisan languages, have had linguistic influences on Bantu languages. The Bantu language speakers of the Okavango and Zambezi regions migrated to the area during the Bantu Migration, and came in contact with the native Khoe speakers in the area. Several Bantu languages of this area adapted the clicks of the Khoe languages and integrated them into their phonology, in a reduced manner through paralexification. Some scholars argue that the "contact-induced" changes in Bantu languages have contributed to the general language shift away from Khoe languages, such as Khwe, to Bantu languages because of the increased familiarity in phonology.

== Distribution ==
The Khoe mainly occupy the Okavango Delta of Botswana. Specifically, Khwe speakers primarily live in the western Caprivi area in Namibia, however, the entirety of the Khoe population occupies a much larger geography. Khwe speakers in the western Caprivi are somewhat distant, lexically, from other similar Khoe languages, such as Damara. According to a dialect survey conducted by the University of Namibia's Department of African Languages, it was revealed that proto-Damara most likely migrated through the western Caprivi area before the Khwe settled the area, as there is little lexical overlap.

The Khwe speakers' distribution in the greater Kavango-Zambezi region influenced clicks in Khoisan languages, some argue. The Khwe, and other Khoe language speaking peoples, resided in greater Southern Africa, prior to the great Bantu Migration, which occurred about 5,000 years ago. In this migration, the Bantu speaking population of West and Central Africa, around the Nigeria-Cameroon borderlands, migrated to Southern Africa, and in this process, encountered the native Khwe population. While the Khwe migrated into the Caprivi and greater Kavango-Zambezi region after the Damara, they were certainly there 5,000 years ago when Bantu speakers migrated to the area, and through their linguistic and cultural exchanges, both languages were fundamentally altered. The morphology, syntax, and phonology sections on this page further discuss the changes occurred, and how it has influenced contemporary Khwe.

Today, an estimated 3,700 Khwe speakers live in Namibia, with the vast majority residing in the western region of the Zambezi Region. The largest known Khwe settlements are Mutc'iku, located adjacent to the Okavango River, and Gudigoa in Botswana.

Noting this, there have been major forced migrations from government pressures that have influenced the contemporary distribution of Khwe speakers. In 1990, 4,000 Xhu- and Khwe-speaking people, including former members of the 31 Battalion (SWATF) who fought under the South African Defence Force in the Namibian War, were settled in a tent town in Schmidtsdrift, South Africa. In 2003, the majority of this community relocated to Platfontein, outside Kimberley, following the Schmidtsdrift Community Land Claim.

== Phonology ==
Khwe has 70 phonemic consonants, including 36 clicks, as well as 25 vowel phonemes, including diphthongs and nasalised vowels. Khwe's tone system has been analysed as containing 9 syllabic tones (3 register and 6 contour), although more recent proposed analyses identify only 3 lexical tones, high, mid and low, with the mora as the basic unit of phonological structure. Tone sandhi processes are common in Khwe and related languages.

=== Vowels ===
Khwe vowels
	Front	Central	Back
Close	i		u
Close-mid	e		o
Open-mid	ɛ		o
Open		a	

Diphthongs
Close	ui	ue	uɛ	ua
Close-mid	ei	eu		
Close-mid	oe	oɛ	oa	
Open	ae	ao		

- /o/ is realized as [o] when lengthened, but is realized as [ɔ] if it is pronounced short.
- Three nasal vowels are recognized as /ã ĩ ũ/. A nasal /õ/ also exists, but only in diphthongs as /õã/.
- Nasal diphthongs include /ãĩ, ũĩ, ãũ, õã/.
- /oɛ/ and /uɛ/ are free in variation with /oe/ and /ue/, but only dependent upon speakers.

=== Consonants ===
Khwe pulmonic consonants
		Labial	Alveolar	Post- alveolar	Palatal	Velar		Uvular	Glottal
		Labial	Alveolar	Post- alveolar	Palatal	plain	pal.	Uvular	Glottal
Nasal		m	n		ɲ	ŋ			
Plosive	voiceless	p	t			k	kʲ	q	ʔ
Plosive	aspirated	pʰ	tʰ			kʰ	kʰʲ		
Plosive	ejective		tʼ						
Plosive	voiced	b	d			ɡ	ɡʲ		
Plosive	prenasal	ᵐb	ⁿd			ᵑɡ			
Affricate	voiceless			t͡ʃ					
Affricate	voiced			d͡ʒ					
Affricate	velar		tx	t͡ʃx					
Affricate	ejective			t͡ʃʼ		kxʼ			
Fricative	voiceless	f		ʃ		x			h
Fricative	voiced	v							
Trill			r						
Approximant			(l)		j	w			

- /ʃ/ is realized as [ç] in Buma-Khwe, but as [s] in ǁXo-Khwe and Buga-Khwe, and as [ʃ] in ǁXom-Khwe.
- /l/ is only found in borrowings.

==== Clicks ====
Khoe click inventories generally combine four anterior constrictions types with nine to eleven anterior constrictions. The exact size of the click inventory in Khwe is unclear. Köhler established an inventory of 36 click phonemes, from combinations of four influxes /ǀ ǂ ǃ ǁ/, and nine effluxes (only five on the alveolar), as well as a borrowed voiced alveolar click, /ǃᶢ/. Khwe is the only language to have a pre-nasalized voiced click.

Khwe clicks
	Dental	Alveolar	Palatal	Lateral
Voiceless	ǀᵏ	ǃᵏ	ǂᵏ	ǁᵏ
Glottalized	ǀˀ	ǃˀ	ǂˀ	ǁˀ
Voiced	ǀᶢ	ǃᶢ	ǂᶢ	ǁᶢ
Aspirated	ǀᵏʰ	ǃᵏʰ	ǂᵏʰ	ǁᵏʰ
Nasal	ᵑǀ	ᵑǃ	ᵑǂ	ᵑǁ
Voiced nasal	ᵑǀᶢ	ᵑǃᶢ	ᵑǂᶢ	ᵑǁᶢ
Uvular stop	ǀq	ǃq	ǂq	ǁq
Fricative	ǀᵏˣ	ǃᵏˣ	ǂᵏˣ	ǁᵏˣ
Affricate ejective	ǀᵏˣʼ	ǃᵏˣʼ	ǂᵏˣʼ	ǁᵏˣʼ

=== Tones ===
There are three tones in Khwe: high /V́/, mid /V̄/, low /V̀/. Long vowels and diphthongs have eight tones (missing only *mid–low as a combination).

== Orthography ==
In 1957, Oswin Köhler, founder of the Institut für Afrikanistik at the University of Cologne, designed an orthography of Khwe in which he published three volumes of texts and grammatical sketches, based on observations of language and culture made over 30 years of visits to Namibia. As Köhler's orthography was designed for academic purposes, his volumes were published in German and French, and therefore inaccessible to the Khwe themselves. Köhler never made an attempt to teach literacy to members of the community.

Attempts to teach the Khwe orthography to first language speakers were not made until 1996, by scholars of the institute who took up Köhler's work. At the request and with the consultation of the Khwe, the orthography was revised and simplified by Matthias Brenzinger and Mathias Schladt between 1996 and 1997.

A collection of Khwe folktales was published in 1999 by Christa Kilian-Hatz and David Naude, using the revised orthography along with interlinear and free translations. Kilian-Hatz also published a dictionary of Khwe, although this is written in the linguistic orthography which uses symbols from the International Phonetic Alphabet in place of the Latin script use for the applied orthography.

The revised orthography has not been granted official status in Namibia. The Khwe language is not taught as a subject or used as a language of instruction in formal education, and few literacy materials exist.

== Morphology ==
Khwe is a suffixing language, and thus has a rich inventory of head-marking suffixes on nouns and verbs. Verbs take tense-aspect-mood suffixes (TAMs), marking for causative, applicative, comitative, locative, passive, reflexive and reciprocal. Nouns are marked with person-gender-number suffixes (PGNs). Gender division in Khwe is based on sex, and is expressed by PGNs, with gender being marked even in first-person dual and plural.

Negation in Khwe is indicated with the clause-final negative particle vé, which can be used to indicate non-occurrence of an event, non-equation between entities, and the non-possession of an entity. The post-verbal particle tí can also be used, although its application is limited to prohibitive functions, such as negative imperatives and the negative hortative and jussive constructions, in which vé can also be used.

== Syntax ==
Generally, Khoisan languages have an SV constituent order. Central Khoisan languages have a dominant AOV constituent order, including Khwe, though OAV order is used more frequently in casual conversation and storytelling.

Khwe lacks a separate class of adjectives. Pronouns, nouns and verbs, especially state verbs, can be used attributively. Khwe has a modifier-head order, in which manner adverbs precede the verb, and adjectives and possessors attributes precede the noun.

In Khwe, subjects of intransitive verbs, subjects and direct objects of transitive verbs, and one of the objects of ditransitive verbs are commonly omitted when the participants are known to the speakers through inner- or extra-linguistic context.

Khwe has two multiverbal constructions that may denote a series of closely connected events: serial verb constructions (SVC) and converb constructions. An SVC expresses a complex event composed by two or more single events that happen at the same time, and a converb construction marks the immediate succession of two or more events.

SVCs in Khwe consist of two or more verbs forming a single intonation unit, with only the last verb being marked for TAM. The preceding verbs obligatorily take the active voice suffix. Converb constructions may consist of two or more verbs, only one of which takes the TAM marking.

== Vocabulary ==
In opposition to the postulated linguistic universal regarding the primacy of the visual domain in the hierarchy of the verbs of perception, Khwe's most widely applied verb of perception is ǁám̀, 'taste, smell, touch'. Khwe has three verbs of perception, the other two being mṹũ 'see', and kóḿ 'hear', but ǁám̀, which is semantically rooted in oral perception, is used to convey holistic modes of sensory perception.

The Khwe term xǀóa functions both as a verb 'to be little, few, some' and as an alternative way of expressing the quantity 'three'. This term is unique in its ambiguity among numeral terms used by African hunter-gatherer subsistence communities.

Khwe has a large number of loan words from Afrikaans.
