= Lydia Nyati-Ramahobo =

Motswana linguistic scholar and activist (1957–2025)

- Born: 24 October 1957; Botswana
- Died: 9 May 2025 (aged 67)
- Education: University of Pennsylvania
- Occupations: Linguistic scholar and activist
- Employer: University of Botswana
- Organization: Kamanakao Association

Lydia Nyati-Ramahobo (24 October 1957 – 9 May 2025), also known as Lydia Saleshando, was a Motswana linguistic scholar and activist for the cultural rights of non-Tswanas and the Wayeyi tribe. She was a founder member of the Kamanakao Association.

== Biography ==
Nyati-Ramahobo was born on 24 October 1957 in Botswana. She studied her masters degree and PhD in applied linguistics at the University of Pennsylvania, in Philadelphia, United States, graduating with her doctorate in 1991. Nyati-Ramahobo worked at the University of Botswana as head of the Department of Primary Education and as Dean of the Faculty of Education.

Nyati-Ramahobo was a founder member and chairperson of the Kamanakao Association, founded in 1995, a pressure group for the linguistic and cultural rights of the Wayeyi tribe, promoting the Seyeyi language, and preserving cultural heritage. Although the Wayeyi tribe are a majority in Botswana, theirs is a minority language. She published The National Language: A Resource or a Problem? The Implementation of the Language Policy of Botswana in 2001.

Nyati-Ramahobo also raised concerns about governmental assimilationist policies, tribal questions on police booking forms, and the alleged negligence in the investigation process after the death of paramount chief, Shikati Calvin Kamanakao, who was unrecognised by the government at the time of his death. Due to Nyati-Ramahobo's campaigning efforts, the work of the Kamanakao Association and a tribal coalition, the Government of Botswana set up the Balopi Commission to investigate tribal discrimination and review Sections 77, 78 and 79 of the Constitution of Botswana. The commission found that the structure of the House of Chiefs of Botswana, later renamed Ntlo ya Dikgosi, "tended to be discriminatory" and the Bogosi Act was passed in response.

In 2005, Nyati-Ramahobo was named a Nobel Peace Prize 1000 PeaceWomen Across the Globe (PWAG).

Nyati-Ramahobo died on 9 May 2025.
