= Balopi Commission =

2000 Botswana commission of inquiry

The Presidential Commission of Inquiry into Sections 77, 78 and 79 of the Constitution of Botswana, also known as the Balopi Commission after the chairman of the commission Patrick Balopi, is a Botswana commission of inquiry set up on 28 July 2000 in response to perceived tribal inequality between the dominant Batswana and the smaller minority tribes such as the Wayeyi. (Note: Like other ethnic groups in Botswana, prefixes are used to describe different aspects of the group. For example, a singular Yeyi person is called a Muyeyi, the Yeyi people are called Wayeyi, the Yeyi language is called Shiyeyi. A singular Tswana person is a Motswana, the Tswana people are called Batswana, and the Tswana language is called Setswana.)

== Background ==
We all deserve to be recognised as different tribal groupings who together make a whole called Botswana. We cannot achieve unity by denying other groups their identity, the age of serfdom and domination has long passed.

— Shikati Calvin Kamanakao, former paramount chief of the Wayeyi

Sir Seretse Khama was passionately anti-discrimination and could not have conceivably allowed any discriminatory provisions in the Constitution. He was, in fact, not particularly in favour of chieftainship because he considered it divisive. To him, talking of republicans as junior or senior tribes would have been an anathema.

— Quett Masire, second president of Botswana

In 1995, Lydia Nyati-Ramahobo, a professor at the University of Botswana, founded the Kamanakao Association, an organization that aims "to develop and maintain the Shiyeyi language and culture." The Wayeyi are a Bantu minority group under the Batawana umbrella. Due to feelings of oppression under the Batawana, (Note: Lydia Nyati-Ramahobo said that the Wayeyi "grieved about the present chiefship and passionately expressed their strong feeling that they were not free, as long as they were under the rule of a Motawana chief imposed by the government.") the Wayeyi, with the help of the Kamanakao Association, installed their own paramount chief, Shikati Calvin Kamanakao, (Note: Shikati is "paramount chief" in Shiyeyi.) on 24 April 1999, which was in disagreement with the Chieftainship Act, the Tribal Land Territory Act, and sections 77-79 of the Constitution of Botswana. The Deputy Attorney General Ian Kirby responded by letter to the Wayeyi on 15 July 1999, writing that since the Wayeyi are not a recognized tribe, they could not have their own chief. (Note: The Wayeyi were able to install their own chief after a lawsuit in May 2006.)

Because of the Wayeyi conflict and a parliamentary motion (Note: The motion previously failed in parliament on two separate occasions: once in 1969 by Philip Matante and once in 1988 by Maitshwarelo Dabutha.) by Olifant Mfa on 17 February 1995 to rewrite sections 77-79 of the Constitution to be "tribally neutral", President Festus Mogae appointed twenty-one people to the Presidential Commission of Inquiry into Section 77, 78 and 79 of the Constitution of Botswana, otherwise known as the Balopi Commission after the chairman of the commission Patrick Balopi. The commission was charged with three tasks: "(a) To review sections 77, 78, and 79 of the constitution of Botswana and to seek a construction that would eliminate any interpretation that renders the sections discriminatory; (b) To review and propose the most effective method of selecting members of the House of Chiefs; and (c) To propose and recommend measures to enhance the efficiency and effectiveness of the House of Chiefs."

== Methodology ==
In order to collect public opinions, the members of the commission visited 41 villages and towns, held 43 public meetings, listened to 38 oral submissions, and received 10 group and 40 individual written submissions. The meetings were held in the traditional dikgotla (Note: Kgotla is the Setswana word for "public meeting".) of the tribes.

== Recommendations ==
The commission made the following recommendations in the "White Paper No.1 of 2001":

- Even if sections 77-79 are not unfair, they, and any other mention of a specific tribe, should be removed from the Constitution due to the citizens' perception that they are discriminatory.
- The word "chief" in the Constitution, a remnant of the British monarchy, should be replaced with the word kgosi.
- The House of Chiefs of Botswana should continue to exist as it represents the country's unity, and it should be renamed Ntlo ya Dikgosi, which the government did in 2008 with the Bogosi Act.
- The members of the House of Chiefs should not be allowed to join political parties.
- Members should be chosen based on tribal territorial claims, creating geographically based representation rather than the old method of specifying which tribes can have ex officio members in the House.

== Reactions ==
The president was praised for his efforts by the minority Batswapong in eastern Botswana but was heavily criticised by the Bamangwato because they felt it would "place their paramount chief [and then Vice President of Botswana] Ian Khama on the same level as chiefs from inferior tribes." The Bogosi Act was passed in 2008, replacing the Chieftainship Act. This act removed references of the word "chief" and changed them to kgosi.

=== Revision ===
A revision of the recommendations was made in April 2002 titled the "White Paper No.2 of 2002" which opted to let the selection process for the House remain the same: the eight dikgosi of the main tribes would retain their posts, a move that the House of Chiefs itself approved. President Mogae went on further visits around the country in May 2002 to hold debates about future changes to the constitution, but the consensus among the citizens remains dissatisfied. Minister of Health Joy Phumaphi said that the revision "is a compromise and it does not remove discrimination." Other ministers felt that they did not have enough time to provide feedback to the revision process. A 2007 study by the University of Botswana found that "a significant number of respondents suggest that the Constitution should be reviewed so that it equally recognizes all cultures found in Botswana".

== See also ==
- Bogosi Act
- Ntlo ya Dikgosi
- Kgosi
