= Xu language =

Xu language may refer to:

- !Kung language
- Kxoe language

== See also ==
- Xû language (disambiguation)
