= Zulu language =

Nguni language of eastern South Africa and neighbouring countries

Zulu
- isiZulu
- Pronunciation: [isízṳːlu]
- Native to: South Africa, Lesotho
- Region: KwaZulu-Natal and southern Mpumalanga; scattered communities elsewhere
- Ethnicity: Zulu
- Speakers: L1: 12 million (2013–2017); L2: 16 million (2002); Total: 28 million
- Language family: Niger–Congo?: Atlantic–Congo; Volta-Congo; Benue–Congo; Bantoid; Southern Bantoid; Bantu; Southern Bantu; Nguni-Tsonga; Nguni; Zunda; Zulu
- Dialects: KwaZulu Natal Zulu; Transvaal Zulu; Qwabe; Cele; Ngoni
- Writing system: Latin (Zulu alphabet); Zulu Braille; Ditema tsa Dinoko
- Signed forms: Signed Zulu

Official status
- Official language in: South Africa
- Regulated by: Pan South African Language Board

Language codes
- ISO 639-1: zu
- ISO 639-2: zul
- ISO 639-3: zul
- Glottolog: zulu1248
- Guthrie code: S.42
- Linguasphere: 99-AUT-fg incl. varieties 99-AUT-fga to 99-AUT-fge
- Proportion of the South African population that speaks Zulu at home 0–20% 20–40% 40–60% 60–80% 80–100%

Zulu
- Person: umZulu
- People: amaZulu
- Language: isiZulu
- Country: kwaZulu

Zulu (/ˈzuːluː/ ZOO-loo), also known by its endonym isiZulu, is a Southern Bantu language of the Nguni branch spoken in, and indigenous to, Southern Africa with about 13.56 million native speakers, who primarily inhabit the province of KwaZulu-Natal in South Africa. Zulu is the most widely spoken home language in South Africa (24% of the population), and it is understood by over 50% of its population. It became one of South Africa's 12 official languages in 1994.

According to Ethnologue, it is the second-most widely spoken of the Bantu languages, after Swahili. (Note: Ethnologue estimates (calculated between 2000 and 2015): Swahili: 98 million (L1: 16 million, L2: 80 million); Zulu: 27 million (L1: 11 million, L2: 16 million); Shona 9 million (L1: 7 million, L2: 2 million)) Like many other Bantu languages, it is written with the Latin alphabet.

In South African English, the language is often referred to in its native form, isiZulu.

== Geographical distribution ==
Geographical distribution of Zulu in South Africa: density, of Zulu home-language speakers. <1 /km^{2} 1–3 /km^{2} 3–10 /km^{2} 10–30 /km^{2} 30–100 /km^{2} 100–300 /km^{2} 300–1000 /km^{2} 1000–3000 /km^{2} >3000 /km^{2}

Zulu migrant populations have taken it to adjacent regions, especially Zimbabwe, where the Northern Ndebele language (isiNdebele) is closely related to Zulu.

Xhosa, the predominant language in the Eastern Cape, is often considered mutually intelligible with Zulu, as is Northern Ndebele.

Maho (2009) lists four dialects: central KwaZulu-Natal Zulu, northern Transvaal Zulu, eastern coastal Qwabe, and western coastal Cele.

== History ==
Like Xhosa and other Nguni people, the Zulu have lived in South Africa for hundreds of years. The Zulu language possesses several click sounds typical of Southern African languages, which are not found in the rest of Africa. The Nguni people have coexisted with other Southern tribes like the San and Khoi.

Zulu, like most indigenous Southern African languages, was not a written language until the arrival of European missionaries, who documented the language using the Latin script. The first grammar book of the Zulu language was published in Norway in 1850 by the Norwegian missionary Hans Schreuder. The first written document in Zulu was a Bible translation that appeared in 1883. In 1901, John Dube (1871–1946), a Zulu from Natal, created the Ohlange Institute, the first native educational institution in South Africa. He was also the author of Insila kaShaka, the first novel written in Zulu (1930). Another pioneering Zulu writer was Reginald Dhlomo, author of several historical novels of the 19th-century leaders of the Zulu nation: U-Dingane (1936), U-Shaka (1937), U-Mpande (1938), U-Cetshwayo (1952) and U-Dinizulu (1968). Other notable contributors to Zulu literature include Benedict Wallet Vilakazi and, more recently, Oswald Mbuyiseni Mtshali.

The written form of Zulu was controlled by the Zulu Language Board of KwaZulu-Natal. This board has now been disbanded and superseded by the Pan South African Language Board which promotes the use of all eleven official languages of South Africa.

== Contemporary usage ==
English and Afrikaans (earlier Dutch) were the only official languages used by South African governments before 1994. However, in the Kwazulu bantustan, the Zulu language was widely used. All education in the country at the high school level was in English or Afrikaans. Since the fall of apartheid in 1994, Zulu has been enjoying a marked revival. Zulu-language television was introduced by the SABC in the early 1980s and it broadcasts news and many shows in Zulu. Zulu radio is very popular and newspapers such as isoLezwe, Ilanga and UmAfrika in the Zulu language are available in Kwazulu-Natal province and Johannesburg. In January 2005 the first full-length feature film in Zulu, Yesterday, was nominated for an Oscar.

In the 1994 film The Lion King, in the "Circle of Life" song, the phrases Ingonyama nengw' enamabala (English: A lion and a leopard spots), Nans' ingonyama bakithi Baba (English: Here is/behold the king, my people) and Siyonqoba (English: We will conquer) was used. In some movie songs, like "This Land", the voice says Busa leli zwe bo (Rule this land) and Busa ngothando bo (Rule with love) were used too.

The song Siyahamba is a South African hymn originally written in the Zulu language that became popular in North American churches in the 1990s.

The remix of the 2019 song Jerusalema contains lyrics in Zulu.

=== Standard vs Urban Zulu ===
Standard Zulu as it is taught in schools, also called "deep Zulu" (isiZulu esijulile), differs in various respects from the language spoken by people living in cities (Urban Zulu, isiZulu sasedolobheni). Standard Zulu tends to be purist, using derivations from Zulu words for new concepts, whereas speakers of Urban Zulu use loan words abundantly, mainly from English. For example:

Standard Zulu	Urban Zulu	English
umakhalekhukhwini	iselula	mobile(cellular) phone
Ngiyezwa	Ngiya-andastenda	I understand

This situation has led to problems in education because standard Zulu is often not understood by young people.

== Phonology ==
=== Vowels ===
Zulu vowel chart, from Wade (1996)

The vowel system of Zulu consists of five vowels.

	Front	Central	Back
Close	i		u
Mid	ɛ		ɔ
Open		a	

/ɛ/ and /ɔ/ are pronounced [e] and [o], respectively, if the following syllable contains the [+ATR] vowels /i/ or /u/. They are [ɛ] and [ɔ] otherwise:

- umgibeli "passenger", phonetically [úm̩̀ɡìɓé(ː)lì]
- ukupheka "to cook", phonetically [ùɠúpʰɛ̀(ː)ɠà]

There is limited vowel length in Zulu, as a result of the contraction of certain syllables. For example, the word ithambo /íːtʰámbó/ "bone", is a contraction of an earlier ilithambo /ílítʰámbó/, which may still be used by some speakers. Likewise, uphahla /úːpʰaɬa/ "roof" is a contraction of the earlier uluphahla /ulúpʰaɬa/. In addition, the vowel of the penultimate syllable is allophonically lengthened phrase- or sentence-finally.

=== Consonants ===
Zulu phonemes
		Labial	Dental/Alveolar		Palatal (-alveolar)	Velar	Glottal
		Labial	median	lateral	Palatal (-alveolar)	Velar	Glottal
Click	plain		ᵏǀʼ	ᵏǁʼ	ᵏǃʼ		
Click	aspirated		ᵏǀʰ	ᵏǁʰ	ᵏǃʰ		
Click	nasalised		ᵑǀ	ᵑǁ	ᵑǃ		
Click	slack-voiced oral		ᶢǀʱ	ᶢǁʱ	ᶢǃʱ		
Click	slack-voiced nasal		ᵑǀʱ	ᵑǁʱ	ᵑǃʱ		
Nasal	modally voiced	m	n		ɲ		
Nasal	slack-voiced	mʱ	nʱ			(ŋʱ)	
Plosive	plain	pʼ	tʼ			kʼ	
Plosive	aspirated	pʰ	tʰ			kʰ	
Plosive	slack-voiced	bʱ	dʱ			ɡʱ	
Plosive	implosive	ɓ				ɠ	
Affricate	plain		tsʼ		tʃʼ	kxʼ~k𝼄ʼ	
Affricate	slack-voiced				dʒʱ		
Fricative	voiceless	f	s	ɬ	ʃ		h
Fricative	slack-voiced	vʱ	zʱ	ɮʱ			ɦ
Liquid			(r)	l			
Semivowel	modally voiced				j	w	
Semivowel	slack-voiced				jʱ	wʱ	

1. The plain voiceless plosives, affricates and clicks are realised phonetically as ejectives [pʼ], [tʼ], [kʼ], [tsʼ], [tʃʼ] [kxʼ].
2. When not preceded by a nasal, /ɠ/ is almost in complementary distribution with /k/ and /kʰ/. The latter two phonemes occur almost exclusively root-initially, while /ɠ/ appears exclusively medially. Recent loanwords contain /k/ and /kʰ/ in other positions, e.g. isekhondi /iːsekʰoːndi/ "second", ibhayisikili /iːbajisikiːli/ "bicycle".
3. The slack-voiced consonants are depressor consonants. These have a lowering effect on the tone of their syllable.
4. The consonant /ŋ/ occurs in some dialects as a reduction of the cluster /nɡ/ when it is not in stem-initial position, and is therefore always slack-voiced.
5. The trill /r/ is not native to Zulu except in expressive words, but occurs in recent borrowings from European languages.

The use of click consonants is one of the most distinctive features of Zulu. This feature is shared with several other languages of Southern Africa, but it is very rare in other regions. There are three basic articulations of clicks in Zulu:

- Denti-alveolar /ǀ/, comparable to a sucking of teeth, as the sound one makes for 'tsk tsk'.
- Postalveolar /!/, comparable to a bottle top 'pop'.
- Lateral /ǁ/, comparable to a click that one may do for a walking horse.

Each articulation covers five click consonants, with differences such as being slack-voiced, aspirated or nasalised, for a total of 18.

=== Phonotactics ===
Zulu syllables are canonically (N)C(w)V, and words must always end in a vowel. Consonant clusters consist of any consonant, optionally preceded by a homorganic nasal consonant (so-called "prenasalisation", described in more detail below) and optionally followed by the consonant /w/.

In addition, syllabic /m̩/ occurs as a reduction of former /mu/, and acts like a true syllable: it can be syllabic even when not word-initial, and can also carry distinctive tones like a full syllable. It does not necessarily have to be homorganic with the following consonant, although the difference between homorganic nonsyllabic /mC/ and syllabic /m̩C/ is distinctive, e.g. umpetshisi /um̩pétʃiːsi/ "peach tree" (5 syllables) versus impoko /ímpoːɠo/ "grass flower" (3 syllables). Moreover, sequences of syllabic m and homorganic m can occur, e.g. ummbila /úm̩mbíːla/ "maize" (4 syllables).

Recent loanwords from languages such as English may violate these constraints, by including additional consonant clusters that are not native to Zulu, such as in igremu /iːgreːmu/ "gram". There may be some variation between speakers as to whether clusters are broken up by an epenthetic vowel or not, e.g. ikhompiyutha /iːkʰompijuːtʰa/ or ikhompyutha /iːkʰompjuːtʰa/ "computer".

=== Prosody ===
==== Stress ====
Stress in Zulu words is mostly predictable and normally falls on the penultimate syllable of a word. It is accompanied by an allophonic lengthening of the vowel. When the final vowel of a word is long due to contraction, it receives the stress instead of the preceding syllable.

Lengthening does not occur on all words in a sentence, however, but only those that are sentence- or phrase-final. Thus, for any word of at least two syllables, there are two different forms, one with penultimate length and one without it, occurring in complementary distribution. In some cases, there are morphemic alternations that occur as a result of word position as well. The remote demonstrative pronouns may appear with the suffix -ana when sentence-final, but only as -ā otherwise. Likewise, the recent past tense of verbs ends in -ile sentence-finally, but is reduced to -ē medially. Moreover, a falling tone can only occur on a long vowel, so the shortening has effects on tone as well.

Some words, such as ideophones or interjections, can have stress that deviates from the regular pattern.

==== Tone ====
Like almost all other Bantu and other African languages, Zulu is tonal. There are three main tonemes: low, high and falling. Zulu is conventionally written without any indication of tone, but tone can be distinctive in Zulu. For example, the words "priest" and "teacher" are both spelt umfundisi, but they are pronounced with different tones: /úm̩fúndisi/ for the "priest" meaning, and /úm̩fundísi/ for the "teacher" meaning.

In principle, every syllable can be pronounced with either a high or a low tone. However, low tone does not behave the same as the other two, as high tones can "spread" into low-toned syllables while the reverse does not occur. A low tone is therefore better described as the absence of any toneme; it is a kind of default tone that is overridden by high or falling tones. The falling tone is a sequence of high-low and occurs only on long vowels. The penultimate syllable can also bear a falling tone when it is long due to the word's position in the phrase. However, when it shortens, the falling tone becomes disallowed in that position.

In principle, every morpheme has an inherent underlying tone pattern which does not change regardless of where it appears in a word. However, like most other Bantu languages, Zulu has word tone, meaning that the pattern of tones acts more like a template to assign tones to individual syllables, rather than a direct representation of the pronounced tones themselves. Consequently, the relationship between underlying tone patterns and the tones that are pronounced can be quite complex. Underlying high tones tend to surface rightward from the syllables where they are underlyingly present, especially in longer words.

==== Depressor consonants ====
The slack-voiced consonants in Zulu are depressor consonants, or depressors for short. Depressor consonants have a lowering effect on pitch, adding a non-phonemic low-tone onset to the normal tone of the syllable. Thus, in syllables with depressor consonants, high tones are realised as rising, and falling tones as rising-then-falling. In both cases, the pitch does not reach as high as in non-depressed syllables. The possible tones on a syllable with a voiceless consonant like hla are [ɬá ɬâ ɬà], and the possible tones of a slack-voice syllable, like dla, are [ɮǎ̤ ɮa̤᷈ ɮà̤]. A depressor does not affect a syllable that's already low, but it blocks assimilation to a preceding high tone so that the tone of the depressor syllable and any following low-tone syllables stays low.

=== Phonological processes ===
==== Prenasalisation ====
Prenasalisation occurs whenever a consonant is preceded by a homorganic nasal, either lexically or as a consequence of prefixation. The most notable case of the latter is the class 9 noun prefix in-, which ends in a homorganic nasal. Prenasalisation triggers several changes in the following consonant, some of which are phonemic and others allophonic. The changes can be summed as follows:

Normal	Prenasalised	Rule
/pʰ/, /tʰ/, /kʰ/	/mp/, /nt/, /ŋk/	Aspiration is lost on obstruents.
/ǀʰ/, /ǁʰ/, /ǃʰ/	/ᵑǀ/, /ᵑǁ/, /ᵑǃ/	Aspiration is replaced by nasalisation of clicks.
/ǀ/, /ǁ/, /ǃ/	/ᵑǀʱ/, /ᵑǁʱ/, /ᵑǃʱ/	Plain clicks become slack-voice nasal.
/ɓ/	/mb/	Implosive becomes slack-voice plosives.
/f/, /s/, /ʃ/, /ɬ/ /v/, /z/, /ɮ/	[ɱp̪fʼ], [ntsʼ], /ntʃ/, [ntɬʼ] [ɱb̪vʱ], [ndzʱ], [ndɮʱ]	Fricatives become affricates. Only phonemic, and thus reflected orthographically, for /ntʃ/.
/h/, /ɦ/, /w/, /wʱ/	[ŋx], [ŋɡʱ], [ŋɡw], [ŋɡwʱ]	Approximants are fortified. This change is allophonic, and not reflected in the orthography.
/j/	/ɲ/	Palatal approximant becomes palatal nasal.
/l/	/l/ or rarely /nd/	The outcome /nd/ is a fossilised outcome from the time when /d/ and /l/ were still one phoneme. See Proto-Bantu language.
/m/, /n/, /ɲ/	/m/, /n/, /ɲ/	No change when the following consonant is itself a nasal.

==== Tone assimilation ====
Zulu has tonic assimilation: high tones tend to spread allophonically to following low-tone syllables, raising their pitch to a level just below that of adjacent high-tone syllables. A toneless syllable between a high-tone syllable and another tonic syllable assimilates to that high tone. That is, if the preceding syllable ends on a high tone and the following syllable begins with a high tone (because it is high or falling), the intermediate toneless syllable has its pitch raised as well. When the preceding syllable is high but the following is toneless, the medial toneless syllable adopts a high-tone onset from the preceding syllable, resulting in a falling tone contour.

For example, the English word spoon was borrowed into Zulu as isipunu, phonemically /ísipúnu/. The second syllable si assimilates to the surrounding high tones, raising its pitch, so that it is pronounced [ísípʼúːnù] sentence-finally. If tone pitch is indicated with numbers, with 1 highest and 9 lowest pitch, then the pitches of each syllable can be denoted as 2-4-3-9. The second syllable is thus still lower in pitch than both of the adjacent syllables.

==== Tone displacement ====
Depressor consonants have an effect called tone displacement. Tone displacement occurs whenever a depressor occurs with a high tone, and causes the tone on the syllable to shift rightward onto the next syllable. If the next syllable is long, it gets a falling tone, otherwise a regular high tone. If the penultimate syllable becomes high (not falling), the final syllable dissimilates and becomes low if it was not already. Tone displacement is blocked under the following conditions:

- When the syllable has a long vowel.
- When the following syllable also has a depressor consonant.
- When the following syllable is the final syllable and is short.

Whenever tone displacement is blocked, this results in a depressor syllable with a high tone, which will have the low-tone onset as described above. When the following syllable already has a high or falling tone, the tone disappears from the syllable as if it had been shifted away, but the following syllable's tone is not modified.

Some examples:

- izipunu "spoons", the plural of isipunu from the previous section, is phonemically /ízipúnu/. Because /z/ is a depressor consonant, tone assimilation is prevented. Consequently, the word is pronounced as [ízìpʼúːnù] sentence-finally, with a low tone in the second syllable.
- izintombi "girls" is phonemically /izíntombí/. /z/ is a depressor, and is not blocked, so the tone shifts to the third syllable. This syllable can be either long or short depending on sentence position. When long, the pronunciation is [ìzìntômbí], with a falling tone. However, when the third syllable is short, the tone is high, and dissimilation of the final syllable occurs, resulting in [ìzìntómbì].
- nendoda "with a man" is phonemically /nʱéndoda/. /nʱ/ is a depressor, but so is /d/, so tone displacement is blocked. Consequently, the pronunciation is [nʱěndɔ̀ːdà], with rising pitch in the first syllable due to the low-onset effect.

==== Palatalization ====
Palatalization is a change that affects labial and alveolar consonants whenever they are immediately followed by /j/. While palatalization occurred historically, it is still productive and occurs as a result of the addition of suffixes beginning with /j/. A frequent example is the diminutive suffix -yana.

Moreover, Zulu does not generally tolerate sequences of a labial consonant plus /w/. Whenever /w/ follows a labial consonant, it changes to /j/, which then triggers palatalization of the consonant. This effect can be seen in the locative forms of nouns ending in -o or -u, which change to -weni and -wini respectively in the locative. If a labial consonant immediately precedes, palatalization is triggered. The change also occurs in nouns beginning in ubu- with a stem beginning with a vowel.

The following changes occur as a result of palatalization:

Original consonant	Palatalized consonant	Examples
pʰ	ʃ	impuphu → impushana (diminutive); izipho → ezisheni (locative)
tʰ	ʃ	umuthi → umshana (diminutive; also umthana)
p	tʃʼ	umtapo → emtatsheni (locative)
t	tʃʼ	ikati → ikatshana (diminutive)
bʱ	tʃʼ	intaba → intatshana (diminutive); ingubo → engutsheni (locative); ubu- + -ani → utshani (ubu- + vowel)
b	dʒ	isigubhu → isigujana (diminutive)
d	dʒ	incwadi → incwajana (diminutive; also incwadana)
m	ɲ	inkomo → inkonyana (diminutive); umlomo → emlonyeni (locative)
n	ɲ	inyoni → inyonyana (diminutive)
mp	ntʃʼ	inswempe → inswentshana (diminutive)
nt	ntʃʼ	umkhonto → umkhontshwana (diminutive)
mb	ndʒ	ithambo → ethanjeni (locative)
nd	ndʒ	isondo → isonjwana (diminutive; also isondwana)

== Orthography ==
Zulu is primarily written in a Latin alphabet, and occasionally in Ditema syllabics. In Malawi, Ngoni dialect may be written in Mwangwego script.

Zulu employs the 26 letters of the ISO basic Latin alphabet. However, some of the letters have different pronunciations than in English. Additional phonemes are written using sequences of multiple letters. Tone, stress and vowel length are not indicated.

Letter(s)	Phoneme(s)	Example
a	/a/	amanzi /ámáːnzi/ "water"
b	/ɓ/	ubaba /úɓaːɓá/ "my/our father"
bh	/b/	ukubhala /úɠubâːla/ "to write"
c	/ǀ/	icici /îːǀíːǀi/ "earring"
ch	/ǀʰ/	ukuchaza /uɠúǀʰaːza/ "to fascinate/explain"
d	/d/	idada /íːdaːda/ "duck"
dl	/ɮ/	ukudla /úɠuːɮá/ "to eat"
e	/e/	ibele /îːɓéːle/ "breast"
f	/f/	ifu /íːfu/ "cloud"
g	/ɡ/	ugogo /úɡóːɡo/ "grandmother"
gc	/ᶢǀʱ/	isigcino /isíᶢǀʱiːno/ "end"
gq	/ᶢǃʱ/	uMgqibelo /umúᶢǃʱiɓéːlo/ "Saturday"
gx	/ᶢǁʱ/	ukugxoba /uɠúᶢǁʱoːɓa/ "to stamp"
h	/h/	ukuhamba /úɠuháːmba/ "to go"
hh	/ɦ/	ihhashi /îːɦáːʃi/ "horse"
hl	/ɬ/	ukuhlala /uɠúɬaːla/ "to sit"
i	/i/	imini /ímíːni/ "daytime"
j	/dʒ/	uju /úːdʒu/ "honey"
k	/k/	ikati /îːkáːti/ "cat"
k	/ɠ/	ukuza /uɠúːza/ "to come"
kh	/kʰ/	ikhanda /îːkʰâːnda/ "head"
kl	/kx/	umklomelo /umukxómeːlo/ "prize"
l	/l/	ukulala /úɠuláːla/ "sleep"
m	/m/	imali /ímaːlí/ "money"
m	/mʱ/	umama /úmʱáːma/ "my/our mother"
mb	/mb/	imbube /ímbuːɓé/ "lion"
n	/n/	unina /úniːna/ "his/her/their mother"
n	/nʱ/	nendoda /nʱéndoːda/ "with a man"
nc	/ᵑǀ/	incwancwa /íᵑǀwáːᵑǀwa/ "sour corn meal"
ng	/ŋ(ɡ)/	ingane /ínɡáːne/ "child"
ngc	/ᵑǀʱ/	ingcosi /íᵑǀʱoːsí/ "a bit"
ngq	/ᵑǃʱ/	ingqondo /íᵑǃʱoːndo/ "brain"
ngx	/ᵑǁʱ/	ingxenye /íᵑǁʱéːɲe/ "part"
nj	/ɲdʒ/	inja /îːɲdʒá/ "dog"
nk	/ŋk/	inkomo /íŋkoːmó/ "cow"
nq	/ᵑǃ/	inqola /íᵑǃóːla/ "cart"
ntsh	/ɲtʃ/	intshe /îːɲtʃé/ "ostrich"
nx	/ᵑǁ/	inxeba /íːᵑǁeːɓa/ "wound"
ny	/ɲ/	inyoni /íɲoːni/ "bird"
o	/o/	uphondo /úːpʰoːndo/ "horn"
p	/p/	ipipi /îːpíːpi/ "pipe for smoking"
ph	/pʰ/	ukupheka /uɠúpʰeːɠa/ "to cook"
q	/ǃ/	iqaqa /íːǃaːǃá/ "polecat"
qh	/ǃʰ/	iqhude /îːǃʰúːde/ "rooster"
r	/r/	iresiphi /iːrésiːpʰi/ "recipe"
s	/s/	isisu /isíːsu/ "stomach"
sh	/ʃ/	ishumi /îːʃûːmi/ "ten"
t	/t/	itiye /îːtíːje/ "tea"
th	/tʰ/	ukuthatha /úɠutʰáːtʰa/ "to take"
ts	/ts/	itswayi /íːtswaːjí/ "salt"
tsh	/tʃ/	utshani /útʃaːní/ "grass"
u	/u/	ubusuku /úɓusûːɠu/ "night"
v	/v/	ukuvala /uɠúvaːla/ "to close"
w	/w/	ukuwela /uɠúweːla/ "to cross"
w	/wʱ/	wuthando /wʱúːtʰâːndo/ "It's love."
x	/ǁ/	ixoxo /íːǁoːǁo/ "frog"
xh	/ǁʰ/	ukuxhasa /úɠuǁʰáːsa/ "to support"
y	/j/	uyise /újiːsé/ "his/her/their father"
y	/jʱ/	yintombazane /jʱintómbazâːne/ "It's a girl"
z	/z/	umzuzu /umúzuːzú/ "moment"

Reference works and older texts may use additional letters. A common former practice was to indicate the implosive /ɓ/ using the special letter ɓ, while the digraph bh would then be simply written as b. Some references may also write h after letters to indicate that they are of the depressor variety, e.g. mh, nh, yh, a practice that is standard in Xhosa orthography.

Very early texts, from the early 20th century or before, tend to omit the distinction between plain and aspirated voiceless consonants, writing the latter without the h.

Nouns are written with their prefixes as one orthographical word. If the prefix ends with a vowel (as most do) and the noun stem also begins with a vowel, a hyphen is inserted in between, e.g. i-Afrika. This occurs only with loanwords.

== Morphology ==
Here are some of the main features of Zulu:

- Word order is subject–verb–object.
- Morphologically, it is an agglutinative language.
- As in other Bantu languages, Zulu nouns are classified into morphological classes or genders (16 in Zulu), with different prefixes for singular and plural. Various parts of speech that qualify a noun must agree with the noun according to its gender. Such agreements usually reflect part of the original class with which it is agreeing. An example is the use of the class "aba-":

Bonke abantu abaqatha basepulazini bayagawula.
All the strong people on the farm are felling (trees).

The various agreements that qualify the word "abantu" (people) can be seen in effect.

- Its verbal system shows a combination of temporal and aspectual categories in their finite paradigm. Typically verbs have two stems, one for present-undefinite and another for perfect. Different prefixes can be attached to these verbal stems to specify subject agreement and various degrees of past or future tense. For example, in the word uyathanda ("he loves"), the present stem of the verb is -thanda, the prefix u- expresses the third-person singular subject and -ya- is a filler that is used in short sentences.

Suffixes are also put into common use to show the causative or reciprocal forms of a verb stem.

- Most property words (words encoded as adjectives in English) are represented by relatives. In the sentence umuntu ubomvu ("the person is red"), the word ubomvu (root -bomvu) behaves like a verb and uses the agreement prefix u-. however, there are subtle differences; for example, it does not use the prefix ya-.

=== Morphology of root Zulu ===
The root can be combined with several prefixes and thus create other words. For example, here is a table with some words constructed from the roots -Zulu and -ntu (the root for person/people):

Prefix	-zulu	-ntu
um(u)	umZulu (a Zulu person)	umuntu (a person)
ama, aba	amaZulu (Zulu people)	abantu (people)
isi	isiZulu (the Zulu language)	isintu (culture, heritage, mankind)
ubu	ubuZulu (personification/Zulu-like tendencies)	ubuntu (humanity, compassion)
kwa	kwaZulu (place of the Zulu people)	–
i(li)	izulu (the weather/sky/heaven)	–
pha	phezulu (on top)	–
e	ezulwini (in, at, to, from heaven)	–

== Sample phrases and text ==
The following is a list of phrases that can be used when one visits a region whose primary language is Zulu:

Zulu	English
Sawubona	Hello, to one person
Sanibonani	Hello, to a group of people
Unjani? / Ninjani?	How are you (sing.)? / How are you (pl.)?
Ngiyaphila / Siyaphila	I'm okay / We're okay
Ngiyabonga (kakhulu)	Thanks (a lot)
Ungubani igama lakho?	What is your name?
Igama lami ngingu...	My name is...
Isikhathi sithini?	What's the time?
Ngingakusiza?	Can I help you?
Uhlala kuphi?	Where do you stay?
Uphumaphi?	Where are you from?
Uhambe kahle / Sala kahle	Go well / Stay well, used as goodbye. The person staying says "Hamba kahle", and the person leaving says "Sala kahle". Other translations include Go gently and Walk in peace.
Hambani kahle / Salani kahle	Go well / Stay well, to a group of people
Eish!	Wow! (No real European equivalent, used in South African English) (you could try a semi-expletive, such as oh my gosh or what the heck. It expresses a notion of shock and surprise)
Hhayibo	No! / Stop! / No way! (used in South African English too)
Yebo	Yes
Cha	No
Angazi	I don't know
Uyasikhuluma isiNgisi na?	Do you speak English?
Ngisaqala ukufunda isiZulu	I've just started learning Zulu
Uqonde ukuthini?	What do you mean?
Ngiyakuthanda.	I love you

The following is from the preamble to the Constitution of South Africa:

Thina, bantu baseNingizimu Afrika, Siyakukhumbula ukucekelwa phansi kwamalungelo okwenzeka eminyakeni eyadlula; Sibungaza labo abahluphekela ubulungiswa nenkululeko kulo mhlaba wethu; Sihlonipha labo abasebenzela ukwakha nokuthuthukisa izwe lethu; futhi Sikholelwa ekutheni iNingizimu Afrika ingeyabo bonke abahlala kuyo, sibumbene nakuba singafani.

Translation:

We, the people of South Africa, Recognise the injustices of our past; Honour those who suffered for justice and freedom in our land; Respect those who have worked to build and develop our country; and Believe that South Africa belongs to all who live in it, united in our diversity.

== Counting in Zulu ==
=== Counting from 1 to 10 ===
The digital numerical counting etiquette on the fingers begins with the little finger of the left hand to the left thumb and then continues with the right-hand thumb towards the right little finger. Starting with a closed left hand, each finger is extended with each subsequent number from one to five. Once the left hand is open, then counting continues on the right hand with each finger opening in turn. It is noteworthy that in Zulu, the names for the numbers six to nine reflect either the anatomical name of the digit (six, isithupha, means "thumb"), action (seven, isikhombisa, means "the one that points out"), or position/placement (eight or isishiyagalombili, means "two remaining", and nine or isishiyagalolunye, indicating "one remaining").

IsiZulu	English
Kunye	One
Kubili	Two
Kuthathu	Three
Kune	Four
Isihlanu	Five
Isithupha	Six
Isikhombisa	Seven
Isishiyagalombili	Eight
Isishiyagalolunye	Nine
Ishumi	Ten

== Months ==
Months in Zulu

English	Zulu
January	uMasingana
February	uNhlolanja
March	uNdasa
April	uMbasa
May	uNhlaba
June	uNhlangulana
July	uNtulikazi
August	uNcwaba
September	uMandulo
October	uMfumfu
November	uLwezi
December	uZibandlela

== Oral literature ==
=== Proverbs ===
In 1912, Franz Mayr, an Austrian missionary in southern Africa from 1890 until his death in 1914, published a collection of 150 proverbs in Zulu with an English translation. The proverbs include:

- "Inhlwa aibanjwa ngekanda isavela." "The winged termite is not caught by its head as soon as it appears (i.e. wait till you have heard the whole story before you judge or even answer)."
- "Aku 'qaqa lazizwa ukunuka." "No polecat ever smelt its own stink (i.e. nobody recognises his own faults)."
- "Aku'nkwali epandela enya." "There is no partridge that scratches for another (i.e. everyone looks after his own interests)."
- "Ikhot'eyikhotayo." "The cow licks the one that licks her (said of people who help one another)."

John Colenso also included a selection of Zulu proverbs with English translations in his Zulu-English Dictionary, first published in 1884. Here are some of those proverbs:

- "Iqina liphum'embizeni." "The buck has jumped out of the pot (i.e. it has escaped the hunter just when he thought he had it)."
- "Izubela ladhl'indhlovu." "The wood-shaving killed the elephant (by striking it in the eye; used of a small matter producing a very serious result)."
- "Aku'mmango ongena'liba." "There is no hill without a grave (i.e. death is everywhere)."

=== Tales ===
In 1868, Henry Callaway published a collection of traditional Zulu tales told by storytellers in the Colony of Natal; the book includes the Zulu text accompanied by an English translation. The stories include the Tale of Uhlakanyana, a long cycle narrating the adventures of the famous Zulu trickster figure; the story of the Zulu hero Usikulumi and his family; the story of Usitungusohenthle who was carried away by pigeons; and the legend of the mythical bird that gave milk, along with an account of the very real honeyguide bird, called inhlamvu in Zulu. There are many cannibal stories, including Itshe Likantunjambili, "The Cannibal's Cave;" Intombi Namazimu, "The Girl and the Cannibals;" "Umbadhlanyana and the Cannibal;" and Amazimu, "Cannibals," along with an appendix on cannibalism. Women are the main characters in many of the stories, such as Ugungqu-Kubantwana, the popular folktale of the old woman who must seek a pond of clear water; the tale of Princess Umkxakaza-Wakogingqwayo; the tale of Princess Umdhlubu; and the tale of Princess Untombi-Yapansi, along with the story of Ununana-Bosele, the woman who defeated a swallowing monster in the form of an elephant. Some stories, like Ubongopa-Kamagadhlela, feature numerous songs in Zulu, for which Callaway provides the lyrics but not the music.

In 1870, Callaway published The Religious System of the Amazulu which also contains Zulu texts and English translations, including Unkulunkulu, "The Tradition of Creation," along with lengthy Zulu testimony regarding ancestor worship, dream interpretation, divination, and medicine.

=== Riddles ===
Callaway's 1868 collection of Zulu texts also contains 12 riddles in Zulu with an English translation. The riddles include:

- "Kqandela ni inkomo e hlatshelwa 'zibayeni zibili (intwala, ngokuba umuntu u ya i tata engutsheni, ka namandhla oku i bulala ngesitupa si sinye; uma e nga hlanganisi izitupa zozibili, a i kcindezele, i fe." "Guess ye an ox which is slaughtered in two cattle-pens (a louse, for a man takes it out of his blanket, but he cannot kill it with one thumb; but only by bringing the two thumbs together, and squeezing it between them that it may die)."
- "Kqandela ni indoba e nga lali; ku ze ku se i mi, i nga lele (insika a i lali, ngokuba i y' ema njalo, i linde indhlu)." "Guess ye a man who does not lie down; even when it is morning he is standing, he not having lain down (a pillar does not lie down, for it stands constantly and watches the house)."

There are six Zulu riddles reported in the Folklore Journal of the South African Folklore Society in 1880. Here are two of them:

- "Ngi tshele ibizo le'nyoka ende e dhlula izinyoka ezinye? (indhlela)." "Tell me the name of the longest snake? (a road)."
- "Ngu bani oma njalo a ngez'a hlala pansi? (ishilahla)." "Who is it that stands always and never sits? (a tree)."

=== Songs ===
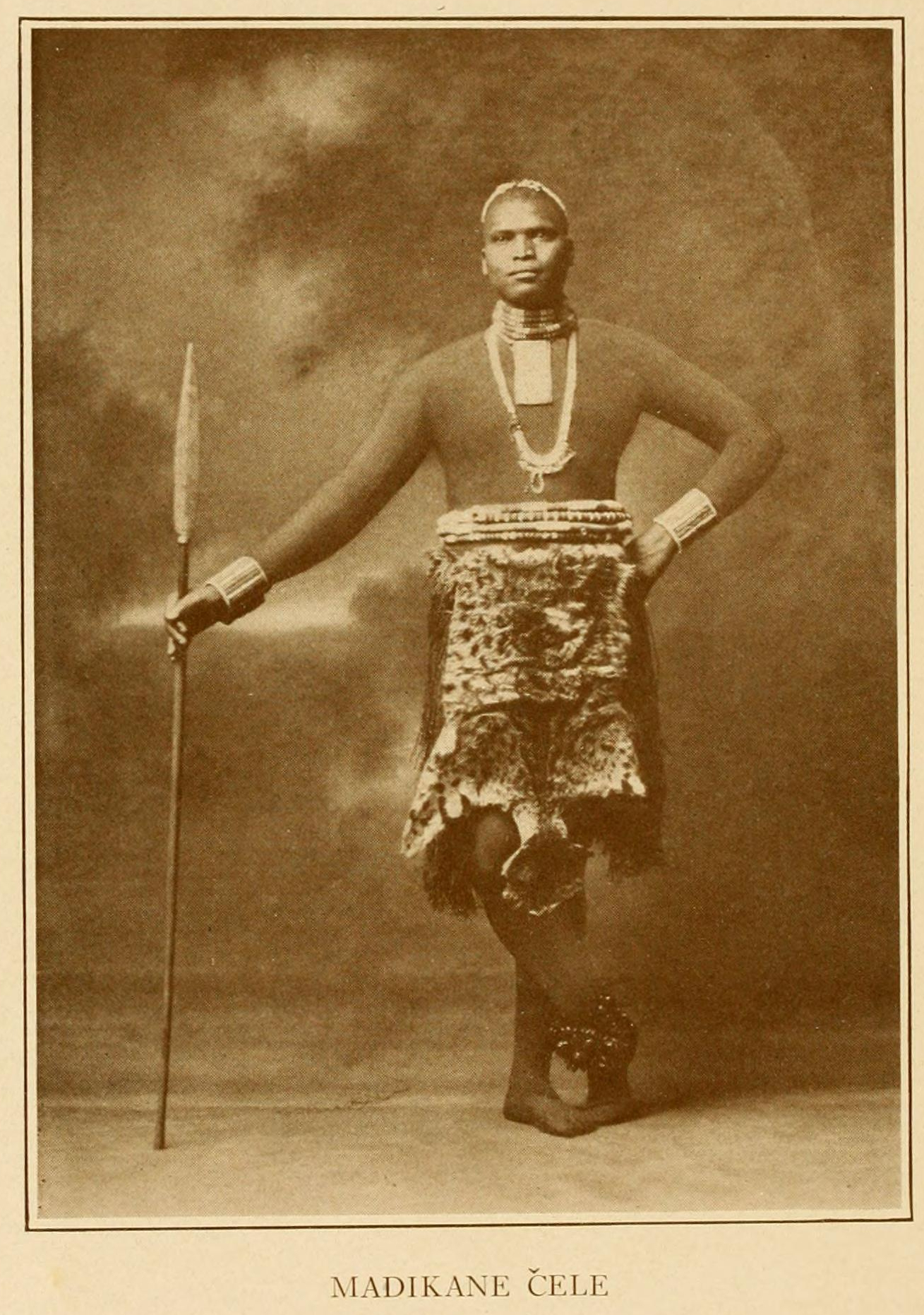
Photograph of Madikane Čele in Zulu clothing, holding a spear (assegai)

In 1920, Madikane Čele contributed Zulu song lyrics and music to Natalie Curtis Burlin's book Songs and Tales from the Dark Continent. Zulu texts and English translations, plus commentary, are provided for "Ingoma yeMpi," "A Song of War;" "Ingoma yaBantwana," "A Song of Children" (lullaby); "Ingoma yokuSina," "A Dance-Song;" "Ingoma yoThando," "A Love-Song," along with the music for the songs.

== Zulu words in South African English ==
South African English has absorbed many words from the Zulu language. Others, such as the names of local animals (impala and mamba are both Zulu names) have made their way into standard English. A few examples of Zulu words used in South African English:

- muti (from umuthi) – medicine
- donga (from udonga) – ditch (udonga means "wall" in Zulu and is also the name for ditches caused by soil erosion)
- indaba – conference (it means "an item of news"' in Zulu)
- induna – chief right handman or leader
- shongololo (from ishongololo) – millipede
- ubuntu – compassion/humanity.

== See also ==
- Impi
- Shaka kaSenzangakhona
- Tsotsitaal – a Zulu-based creole language spoken in Soweto
- Xhosa language
- Northern Ndebele language

== Sources ==
- UCLA Language Materials Project – Zulu.

== Bibliography ==
- Canonici, Noverino, 1996, Imisindo YesiZulu: An Introduction to Zulu Phonology, University of Natal
- Canonici, Noverino, 1996, Zulu Grammatical Structure, University of Natal
- Wade, Rodrik D. (1996). "Structural characteristics of Zulu English". An Investigation of the Putative Restandardisation of South African English in the Direction of a 'New' English, Black South African English (Thesis). Durban: University of Natal. Archived from the original on 13 October 2008.
