= Xû language =

Xû language may refer to:

- Juǀʼhoan language
- Khwe language

== See also ==
- Xu language (disambiguation)
