= Shufu (disambiguation) =

Shufu County is a county in Kashgar Prefecture, Xinjiang Uyghur Autonomous Region, China.

Shufu may refer to the following:

- Shūfu District, Ehime, was a district located in eastern Iyo Province (Ehime Prefecture), Japan
- Boniface Shufu, chief of the Mayeyi people of Namibia
- Li Shufu (born 1963), Chinese entrepreneur and founder of Geely
- Jingdezhen porcelain, Chinese porcelain, also known as Shufu ware

== See also ==
- Shufu no Tomo, Japanese monthly women's magazine between 1917 and 2008
