= Bogosi Act =

Legislation in Botswana defining the office of bogosi or "chieftainship"

National Assembly of Botswana
- Long title: An Act to re-enact with amendments the provisions relating to Bogosi and matters incidental thereto or connected therewith.
- Citation: CAP 41:01, Act 9 of 2008
- Territorial extent: Whole of Botswana
- Enacted by: National Assembly of Botswana
- Commenced: 30 April 2008
- White paper: Government White Paper No. 1 of 2001, Government White Paper No. 2 of 2002

Legislative history
- Bill title: Bogosi Bill, No. 13 of 2007
- Committee report: Balopi Commission

Repeals
- Chieftainship Act

The Bogosi Act is a piece of legislation in Botswana that defines the office of bogosi or "chieftainship" among Botswana's various tribes. The act was written in response to the Balopi Commission recommendation that the Constitution of Botswana replace all references of the word "chief" to the Setswana word kgosi. The Bogosi Act replaces the earlier Chieftainship Act of 1987.

== History ==
Outcry from minority tribes in Botswana such as the Wayeyi pushed President Festus Mogae to create the Balopi Commission on 28 July 2000 to investigate tribal discrimination. The commission found that the structure of the House of Chiefs of Botswana, later renamed Ntlo ya Dikgosi, "tended to be discriminatory". In response, the Bogosi Bill was passed, creating the Bogosi Act.

== Content ==
The Bogosi Act defines the institution of bogosi or tribal chieftainship. A kgosi (plural: dikgosi) is the tribal leader and has the following functions:

- to exercise his or her powers under this Act to promote the welfare of the members of his or her tribe;
- to carry out any lawful instructions given to him or her by the Minister;
- to convene kgotla meetings to obtain advice as to the exercise of his or her functions under this Act;
- to arrange tribal ceremonies;
- to preside over cases in terms of the warrant of his or her court issued under the Customary Courts Act; and
- to perform such other functions as may be conferred on him or her by or under this Act or any other enactment.

The dikgosi of the eight main Batswana tribes automatically become members of the Ntlo ya Dikgosi, an advisory body to the Parliament of Botswana.

== Reaction ==
The act has been criticised by tribal leaders because of the limitations on the powers of a kgosi. In 2010, Kgosi Kgafela II of the Kgatla tribe was accused of flogging, but he argued that dikgosi have immunity to the state's jurisdiction. The Botswana High Court dismissed the case on 11 May 2011, claiming that "dikgosi cannot act outside the constitution and laws prescribed by Parliament when all other functionaries of the state act within the statutory limitations." To avoid the legal costs of the case, Kgafela moved to Moruleng, South Africa.

== See also ==
- Balopi Commission
- Ntlo ya Dikgosi
- Kgosi
