= Voiced lateral click =

Consonantal sound

ǁ̬ ʖ̬

Voiced lateral velar click

ɡǁ ɡʖ

ᶢǁ ᶢʖ

Voiced lateral uvular click

ɢǁ ɢʖ

𐞒ǁ 𐞒ʖ

A voiced lateral click is a click consonant found primarily among the languages of southern Africa. The symbol in the International Phonetic Alphabet for a voiced lateral click with a velar rear articulation is ⟨ɡ͡ǁ⟩ or ⟨ɡ͜ǁ⟩, commonly abbreviated to ⟨ɡǁ⟩, ⟨ᶢǁ⟩ or ⟨ǁ̬⟩; a symbol abandoned by the IPA but still preferred by some linguists is ⟨ɡ͡ʖ⟩ or ⟨ɡ͜ʖ⟩, abbreviated ⟨ɡʖ⟩, ⟨ᶢʖ⟩ or ⟨ʖ̬⟩. For a click with a uvular rear articulation, the equivalents are ⟨ɢ͡ǁ, ɢ͜ǁ, ɢǁ, 𐞒ǁ⟩ and ⟨ɢ͡ʖ, ɢ͜ʖ, ɢʖ, 𐞒ʖ⟩. Sometimes the accompanying letter comes after the click letter, e.g. ⟨ǁɡ⟩ or ⟨ǁᶢ⟩; this may be a simple orthographic choice, or it may imply a difference in the relative timing of the releases.

In languages which use the Bantu letters for clicks, this is most commonly written ⟨gx⟩, but it is written ⟨dx⟩ in those languages that use ⟨g⟩ for the uvular fricative.

== Features ==
Features of a voiced lateral click:

- The airstream mechanism is lingual ingressive (also known as velaric ingressive), which means a pocket of air trapped between two closures is rarefied by a "sucking" action of the tongue, rather than being moved by the glottis or the lungs/diaphragm. The release of the forward closure produces the "click" sound. Voiced and nasal clicks have a simultaneous pulmonic egressive airstream.
- Its phonation is voiced, which means the vocal cords vibrate during the articulation.
- It is an oral consonant, which means that air is not allowed to escape through the nose.
- It is a lateral consonant, which means it is produced by directing the airstream over the sides of the tongue, rather than down the middle.

== Occurrence ==
Voiced lateral clicks are found primarily in the various Khoisan language families of southern Africa and in some neighboring Bantu languages.

| Language | Word | IPA | Meaning |
|---|---|---|---|
| Naro | dxàí cgàa | [ɡ͜ǁàí k͜ǀχàː] = [ᶢʖàí ᵏʇχàː] | 'cheek muscle' |
| Sandawe | gxõgxe | [ɡ͜ǁṍːɡ͜ǁê] = [ᶢʖṍːᶢʖê] | 'male greater kudu' |
| Yeyi | mugǁawa | [muɡ͜ǁawa] = [muᶢʖawa] | 'arrow' |

| Place → | Labial | | | | | Coronal | | | | | | | | | | Dorsal | | | | | Laryngeal | | | |
| Manner ↓ | Bilabial | | Labiodental | | Linguolabial | | Dental | | Alveolar | | Postalveolar | | Retroflex | | (Alveolo-)palatal | | Velar | | Uvular | | Pharyngeal/epiglottal | | Glottal | |
|---|---|---|---|---|---|---|---|---|---|---|---|---|---|---|---|---|---|---|---|---|---|---|---|---|
| Nasal | m̥ | m | ɱ̊ | ɱ | | n̼ | n̪̊ | n̪ | n̥ | n | n̠̊ | n̠ | ɳ̊ | ɳ | ɲ̊ | ɲ | ŋ̊ | ŋ | ɴ̥ | ɴ | | | | |
| Plosive | p | b | p̪ | b̪ | t̼ | d̼ | t̪ | d̪ | t | d | | | ʈ | ɖ | c | ɟ | k | ɡ | q | ɢ | ʡ | | ʔ | |
| Sibilant affricate | | | | | | | t̪s̪ | d̪z̪ | ts | dz | t̠ʃ | d̠ʒ | tʂ | dʐ | tɕ | dʑ | | | | | | | | |
| Non-sibilant affricate | pɸ | bβ | p̪f | b̪v | | | t̪θ | d̪ð | tɹ̝̊ | dɹ̝ | t̠ɹ̠̊˔ | d̠ɹ̠˔ | | | cç | ɟʝ | kx | ɡɣ | qχ | ɢʁ | ʡʜ | ʡʢ | ʔh | |
| Sibilant fricative | | | | | | | s̪ | z̪ | s | z | ʃ | ʒ | ʂ | ʐ | ɕ | ʑ | | | | | | | | |
| Non-sibilant fricative | ɸ | β | f | v | θ̼ | ð̼ | θ | ð | θ̠ | ð̠ | ɹ̠̊˔ | ɹ̠˔ | ɻ̊˔ | ɻ˔ | ç | ʝ | x | ɣ | χ | ʁ | ħ | ʕ | h | ɦ |
| Approximant | | β̞ | | ʋ | | | | ð̞ | | ɹ | | ɹ̠ | | ɻ | | j | | ɰ | | | | | | ˷ |
| Tap/flap | | ⱱ̟ | | ⱱ | | | | | ɾ̥ | ɾ | | | ɽ̊ | ɽ | | | | | | ɢ̆ | | ʡ̮ | | |
| Trill | ʙ̥ | ʙ | | | | | | | r̥ | r | | r̠ | ɽ̊r̥ | ɽr | | | | | ʀ̥ | ʀ | ʜ | ʢ | | |
| Lateral affricate | | | | | | | | | tɬ | dɮ | | | tꞎ | d𝼅 | c𝼆 | ɟʎ̝ | k𝼄 | ɡʟ̝ | | | | | | |
| Lateral fricative | | | | | | | ɬ̪ | | ɬ | ɮ | | | ꞎ | 𝼅 | 𝼆 | ʎ̝ | 𝼄 | ʟ̝ | | | | | | |
| Lateral approximant | | | | | | | | l̪ | l̥ | l | | l̠ | ɭ̊ | ɭ | ʎ̥ | ʎ | ʟ̥ | ʟ | | ʟ̠ | | | | |
| Lateral tap/flap | | | | | | | | | ɺ̥ | ɺ | | | 𝼈̊ | 𝼈 | | ʎ̮ | | ʟ̆ | | | | | | |

| | | BL | LD | D | A | PA | RF | P | V | U |
|---|---|---|---|---|---|---|---|---|---|---|
| Implosive | Voiced | ɓ | | | ɗ | | ᶑ | ʄ | ɠ | ʛ |
| Implosive | Voiceless | ɓ̥ | | | ɗ̥ | | ᶑ̊ | ʄ̊ | ɠ̊ | ʛ̥ |
| Ejective | Stop | pʼ | | | tʼ | | ʈʼ | cʼ | kʼ | qʼ |
| Ejective | Affricate | | p̪fʼ | t̪θʼ | tsʼ | t̠ʃʼ | tʂʼ | tɕʼ | kxʼ | qχʼ |
| Ejective | Fricative | ɸʼ | fʼ | θʼ | sʼ | ʃʼ | ʂʼ | ɕʼ | xʼ | χʼ |
| Ejective | Lateral affricate | | | | tɬʼ | | | c𝼆ʼ | k𝼄ʼ | q𝼄ʼ |
| Ejective | Lateral fricative | | | | ɬʼ | | | | | |
| Click (top: velar; bottom: uvular) | Tenuis | kʘ qʘ | | kǀ qǀ | kǃ qǃ | | k𝼊 q𝼊 | kǂ qǂ | | |
| Click (top: velar; bottom: uvular) | Voiced | ɡʘ ɢʘ | | ɡǀ ɢǀ | ɡǃ ɢǃ | | ɡ𝼊 ɢ𝼊 | ɡǂ ɢǂ | | |
| Click (top: velar; bottom: uvular) | Nasal | ŋʘ ɴʘ | | ŋǀ ɴǀ | ŋǃ ɴǃ | | ŋ𝼊 ɴ𝼊 | ŋǂ ɴǂ | ʞ | |
| Click (top: velar; bottom: uvular) | Tenuis lateral | | | | kǁ qǁ | | | | | |
| Click (top: velar; bottom: uvular) | Voiced lateral | | | | ɡǁ ɢǁ | | | | | |
| Click (top: velar; bottom: uvular) | Nasal lateral | | | | ŋǁ ɴǁ | | | | | |
