= Boniface Shufu =

Chief of the Mayeyi in Namibia from 1993

Boniface Lutibezi Shufu is the chief of the Mayeyi people of Namibia. He was crowned in 1993, after the Namibian government intervened in the conflict between the Mayeyi, who wanted independence, and the Mafwe, who at the time were led by Boniface Bebi Mamili.
