= Yeyi language =

Bantu language of Namibia and Botswana

Yeyi
- Shiyɛyi
- Native to: Namibia, Botswana
- Region: along the Okavango River
- Ethnicity: Yeyi people
- Native speakers: (55,000 cited 2001)
- Language family: Niger–Congo?: Atlantic–Congo; Volta-Congo; Benue–Congo; Bantoid; Southern Bantoid; Bantu (Zone R); Yeyi

Language codes
- ISO 639-3: yey
- Glottolog: yeyi1239
- Guthrie code: R.40 (R.41)
- ELP: Yeyi

Yeyi (Yeyi: Shiyɛyi) is a Bantu language spoken by approximately 50,000 Yeyi people along the Okavango River in Namibia and Botswana.

== Dialects ==
The main dialect is called Shirwanga.

== Status ==
Though most of its older speakers prefer Yeyi in normal conversation, it is being gradually phased out in Botswana by a popular move towards Tswana, with Yeyi only being learned by children in a few villages. Yeyi speakers in the Caprivi Strip of north-eastern Namibia, however, retain Yeyi in villages (including Linyanti), but may also speak the regional lingua franca, Lozi. A slight majority of Botswana Yeyi are monolingual in the national language, Tswana, and the majority of the rest are bilingual.

The Kamanakao Association was formed in 1995 as a pressure group for the linguistic and cultural rights of the Wayeyi tribe, promoting the Seyeyi language, and preserving cultural heritage. Although the Wayeyi tribe are a majority in Botswana, theirs is a minority language.

Lydia Nyati-Ramahobo who was a founder member of the association published The National Language: A Resource or a Problem? The Implementation of the Language Policy of Botswana in 2001.

== Classification ==
Yeyi appears to be a divergent lineage of Bantu. It is usually classified as a member of the R Zone Bantu languages. The language has been phonetically influenced by the Ju languages, though it is no longer in contact with them.

== Phonology ==
Many authors have attempted to transcribe the phonemic inventory of Yeyi, with varying levels of consistency. Broadly, all sources recognize that the phonology is characterized by an extensive consonant inventory combined with a small vowel inventory (albeit a tonal one, though this feature is not analyzed as consistently as the other axioms). The most descriptive study surrounding this categorization, Seidel (2008), is used for the tables listed below. Prior sources had not included the additional categorization of prenasalized consonants.

=== Vowels ===
Yeyi vowels
	Front	Central	Back
Close	i		u
Mid	ɛ		ɔ
Open		a	

Vowel length is also distinctive.

- /ɛ ɔ/ are phonetically realized as [ɛ̝ ɔ̝].
- /ɔ/ can also be heard as [ʊ] in word-final position. /i/ can also be heard as [ə] in prefixes.
- /i u a/ can be heard as nasalized [ĩ ũ ã] when preceding nasal consonants. A nasal [ɛ̝̃] can also be heard, but only in stem-internal position.
- /i u/ can tend to be centralized as [ɨ ʉ] following fricatives and sibilants.

=== Consonants ===
Yeyi consonants
		Bilabial		Labio- dental	Alveolar			Palatal	Velar		Glottal
		plain	pal.	Labio- dental	plain	pal.	sibilant	Palatal	plain	pal.	Glottal
Plosive/ Affricate	voiceless	p			t		ts	tʃ	k	kʲ	(ʔ)
Plosive/ Affricate	aspirated	pʰ			tʰ		tsʰ	tʃʰ	kʰ	kʰʲ	(ʔ)
Plosive/ Affricate	ejective				tʼ		tsʼ	tʃʼ	kʼ	kʲʼ	(ʔ)
Plosive/ Affricate	voiced	b	bʲ		d		dz	dʒ	ɡ	ɡʲ	(ʔ)
Fricative	voiceless			f			s	ʃ			h
Fricative	voiced	(β)		v			z	ʒ			
Nasal		m			n			ɲ	ŋ		
Liquid	rhotic				ɾ ~ r						
Liquid	lateral				l	lʲ					
Approximant		β̞						j	w		

- Most of the consonants may also be labialized [Cʷ], however; their phonemic status is uncertain and may also exist as a result of a historically or synchronically underlying /u/ or diphthongized /ɔ/.
- The glottal stop [ʔ] only occurs between vowels.
- Palatalized-velar stop consonants /kʲ kʰʲ kʲʼ ɡʲ/ may often be heard as palatal stop consonants [c cʰ cʼ ɟ].
- The labial approximant /β̞/ can range from an approximant to a fricative [β̞ ~ β].
- The alveolar rhotic /r/ can be heard as a tap or a trill, but can also be heard as retroflex [ɽ].
- The alveolar lateral /l/ can also be heard as a retroflex [ɭ].

Prenasal consonants
		Bilabial	Labio- dental	Alveolar		Post- alveolar	Velar		Glottal
		Bilabial	Labio- dental	plain	pal.	Post- alveolar	plain	pal.	Glottal
Plosive	voiceless	ᵐp		ⁿt			ᵑk	ᵑkʲ	
Plosive	aspirated	ᵐpʰ		ⁿtʰ			ᵑkʰ		
Plosive	ejective			ⁿtʼ			ᵑkʼ		
Plosive	voiced	ᵐb		ⁿd	ⁿdʲ		ᵑɡ	ᵑɡʲ	
Affricate	voiceless			ⁿts		ⁿtʃ			
Affricate	aspirated			ⁿtsʰ		ⁿtʃʰ			
Affricate	voiced			ⁿdz		ⁿdʒ			
Affricate	ejective			ⁿtsʼ					
Fricative	voiceless		ᶬf	ⁿs		ⁿʃ			
Fricative	voiced		ᶬv	ⁿz		ⁿʒ			

- Prenasal palatalized-velar stops /ᵑkʲ ᵑɡʲ/ may often be heard as prenasal palatal stops [ᶮc ᶮɟ].

==== Clicks ====
Yeyi, influenced by the Juu languages, is one of several Bantu languages along the Okavango with clicks. It has the largest known inventory of clicks of any Bantu language, with dental, alveolar, palatal, and lateral articulations.

Yeyi clicks
			Dental	Post- alveolar	Palatal	Lateral
Plosive	voiceless	plain	ᵏǀ	ᵏ!	ᵏǂ	ᵏǁ
Plosive	voiceless	aspirated	ᵏǀʰ	ᵏ!ʰ	ᵏǂʰ	ᵏǁʰ
Plosive	voiceless	nasalized (asp.)	ᵑǀʰ	ᵑ!ʰ		
Plosive	voiced	plain	ᶢǀ	ᶢ!		
Plosive	voiced	nasalized	ᵑǀ	ᵑ!	ᵑǂ	ᵑǁ
Plosive	voiced	prenasalized	ᵑᶢǀ	ᵑᶢ!		

Lateral clicks only rarely occur.

Yeyi may have up to four click types, dental ǀ, alveolar ǃ, palatal ǂ, and lateral ǁ. However, the actual number of clicks is disputed, as researchers disagree on how many series of manner and phonation the language contrasts.

The following series of manner and phonation, shown here as the alveolar series, are recognized by different authors:

Click	Sommer & Voßen	Fulop et al.	Miller	Seidel	Description
ᵏǃʰ	√	√	√	√	aspirated
ᵏǃ	√	√	√	√	tenuis
ᶢǃ	√	√	√	√	voiced
ᵑǃ	√	√	√	–	nasal
ŋᵏǃʰ	–	–	–	√	prenasalized aspirated
ŋᵏǃ	–	–	–	√	prenasalized tenuis
ŋᶢǃ	√	(cluster)	√	√	prenasalized voiced
ᵏǃʼ	√	√	√	–	oral ejective
ᵑǃˀ	√	(cluster)	√	–	nasal glottalized
ǃqχ	√	–	√	–	uvular fricative
ǃqʼ	?	√	√	–	uvular ejective

The contrast between ejective and glottalized nasal clicks is unusual, but also occurs in Gǀwi.

Sommer & Voßen (1992) consider the uvular ejective series uncertain due to infrequency.

Fulop et al. (2002) studied the clicks of a limited vocabulary sample with 13 Yeyi speakers who were not from the core speaking area. There are in addition prenasalized clicks such as /ŋᶢǃ/ and /ᵑǃˀ/, but Fulop et al. analyze these as consonant clusters, not single sounds. In addition, a reported uvular affricated click appears to actually be velar, with the affrication a variant of aspiration, and so has been included under ᵏǃʰ. There is similar velar affrication with the dental ejective click among some speakers. The ejective clicks are apparently uvular.

Miller (2011), in a comparative study with other languages, interprets the uvular clicks as lingual-pulmonic /ǃ͡qχ/ and lingual–glottalic /ǃ͡qχʼ/. Unfortunately, the speakers interviewed were not from the core Yeyi-speaking area, and they often disagreed on which clicks to use. Although the six dental clicks (ǀ etc.) were nearly universal, only one of the lateral clicks was (the voiced click ᶢǁ). The alveolar clicks (ǃ etc.) were universal apart from the ejective, which was only attested from one speaker, but two of the palatal clicks were only used by half the speakers, at least in the sample vocabulary. The missing palatal and lateral clicks were substituted with alveolar or sometimes dental clicks (palatals only), and the missing ejective alveolar was substituted with a glottalized alveolar. Both of these patterns are consistent with studies of click loss, though it is possible that these speakers maintain these clicks in other words. 23 of the 24 possible permutations were attested in the sample vocabulary by at least one speaker, the exception being the ejective lateral click *ǁʼ. This research needs to be repeated in an area where the language is still vibrant.

Seidel (2008) says that Yeyi has three click types, dental ǀ, alveolar ǃ, and, in two words only, lateral ǁ. There are three basic series, tenuis, aspirated, and voiced, any of which may be prenasalized.

A Yeyi Talking Dictionary was produced by the Living Tongues Institute for Endangered Languages.

== Bibliography ==
- Baumbach, Erdmann (1997). "Languages of the Eastern Caprivi". In Haacke, Wilfrid; Elderkin, Edward (eds.). Namibian Languages: Papers and Reports. Cologne: Rüdiger Köppe Verlag. pp. 307–451.
- Donnelly, Simon S (1990). Phonology and morphology of the noun in Yeeyi (BA Honours dissertation). University of Cape Town.
- Fulop, Sean; Ladefoged, Peter; Liu, Fang; Vossen, Rainer (2002). Yeyi clicks: Acoustic description and analysis.
- Fulop; Ladefoged; Voßen (2007). "The dying clicks of Yeyi".
- Gowlett, Derek (1997). "Aspects of Yeyi Diachronic Phonology". In Haacke, Wilfrid; Elderkin, Edward (eds.). Namibian Languages: Papers and Reports. Cologne: Rüdiger Köppe Verlag. pp. 235–264.
- Gunnink, Hilde (2023). "Vowel harmony in Yeyi". Studies in African Linguistics. 52 (13). Ghent University: 99–120. doi:10.32473/sal.52.Supplement.13.133938.
- Lusekelo, Amani (2009), Frank Seidel 2008. A Grammar of Yeyi. A Bantu Language of Southern Africa. (Review), Tanzania: Dar es Salaam University College of Education
- Seidel, Frank (2008). A Grammar of Yeyi: A Bantu Language of Southern Africa. R. Köppe.
- Sommer, Gabriele (1995). Sozialer Wandel und Sprachverhalten bei den Yeyi (Botswana), Ethnographie des Sprachwechsels. Cologne.
