= Tenuis lateral click =

Consonantal sound

ǁ ʖ
- IPA number: 180, 203

Encoding
- Entity (decimal): &#449;&#662;
- Unicode (hex): U+01C1 U+0296
- Braille: ⠯ (braille pattern dots-12346) ⠇ (braille pattern dots-123)

Tenuis lateral velar click

kǁ kʖ

ᵏǁ ᵏʖ

Tenuis lateral uvular click

qǁ qʖ

𐞥ǁ 𐞥ʖ

A voiceless or more precisely tenuis lateral click is a click consonant found primarily among the languages of southern Africa. The symbol in the International Phonetic Alphabet for a tenuis lateral click with a velar rear articulation is ⟨k͡ǁ⟩ or ⟨k͜ǁ⟩, commonly abbreviated to ⟨kǁ⟩, ⟨ᵏǁ⟩ or just ⟨ǁ⟩; a symbol abandoned by the IPA but still preferred by some linguists is ⟨k͡ʖ⟩ or ⟨k͜ʖ⟩, abbreviated ⟨kʖ⟩, ⟨ᵏʖ⟩ or just ⟨ʖ⟩. For a click with a uvular rear articulation, the equivalents are ⟨q͡ǁ, q͜ǁ, qǁ, 𐞥ǁ⟩ and ⟨q͡ʖ, q͜ʖ, qʖ, 𐞥ʖ⟩. Sometimes the accompanying letter comes after the click letter, e.g. ⟨ǁk⟩ or ⟨ǁᵏ⟩; this may be a simple orthographic choice, or it may imply a difference in the relative timing of the releases.

== Features ==
Features of a tenuis lateral click:

- The airstream mechanism is lingual ingressive (also known as velaric ingressive), which means a pocket of air trapped between two closures is rarefied by a "sucking" action of the tongue, rather than being moved by the glottis or the lungs/diaphragm. The release of the forward closure produces the "click" sound. Voiced and nasal clicks have a simultaneous pulmonic egressive airstream.
- Its phonation is voiceless, unaspirated, and unglottalized, which means it is produced without vibration or constriction of the vocal cords, and any following vowel starts without significant delay.
- It is an oral consonant, which means that air is not allowed to escape through the nose.
- It is a lateral consonant, which means it is produced by directing the airstream over the sides of the tongue, rather than down the middle.

== Occurrence ==
Tenuis lateral clicks are found primarily in the various Khoisan language families of southern Africa and in some neighboring Bantu languages.

Language	Word	IPA	Meaning
Hadza	exekeke	[ʔek͜ǁekeke] = [ʔeᵏʖekeke]	'to listen'
Khoekhoe	ǂamǁgû	[ŋ͜ǂ͡ʔàm̀k͜ǁṹṹ] = [ᵑǂˀàm̀ᵏʖṹṹ]	'to inadvertently bite a hard object'
Zulu	xoxa	[q͜ǁɔːq͜ǁa] = [𐞥ʖɔː𐞥ʖa]	'to converse'

Place →	Labial					Coronal										Dorsal					Laryngeal			
Manner ↓	Bilabial		Labiodental		Linguolabial		Dental		Alveolar		Postalveolar		Retroflex		(Alveolo-)palatal		Velar		Uvular		Pharyngeal/epiglottal		Glottal	
Nasal	m̥	m	ɱ̊	ɱ		n̼	n̪̊	n̪	n̥	n	n̠̊	n̠	ɳ̊	ɳ	ɲ̊	ɲ	ŋ̊	ŋ	ɴ̥	ɴ				
Plosive	p	b	p̪	b̪	t̼	d̼	t̪	d̪	t	d			ʈ	ɖ	c	ɟ	k	ɡ	q	ɢ	ʡ		ʔ	
Sibilant affricate							t̪s̪	d̪z̪	ts	dz	t̠ʃ	d̠ʒ	tʂ	dʐ	tɕ	dʑ								
Non-sibilant affricate	pɸ	bβ	p̪f	b̪v			t̪θ	d̪ð	tɹ̝̊	dɹ̝	t̠ɹ̠̊˔	d̠ɹ̠˔			cç	ɟʝ	kx	ɡɣ	qχ	ɢʁ	ʡʜ	ʡʢ	ʔh	
Sibilant fricative							s̪	z̪	s	z	ʃ	ʒ	ʂ	ʐ	ɕ	ʑ								
Non-sibilant fricative	ɸ	β	f	v	θ̼	ð̼	θ	ð	θ̠	ð̠	ɹ̠̊˔	ɹ̠˔	ɻ̊˔	ɻ˔	ç	ʝ	x	ɣ	χ	ʁ	ħ	ʕ	h	ɦ
Approximant		β̞		ʋ				ð̞		ɹ		ɹ̠		ɻ		j		ɰ						˷
Tap/flap		ⱱ̟		ⱱ					ɾ̥	ɾ			ɽ̊	ɽ						ɢ̆		ʡ̮		
Trill	ʙ̥	ʙ							r̥	r		r̠	ɽ̊r̥	ɽr					ʀ̥	ʀ	ʜ	ʢ		
Lateral affricate									tɬ	dɮ			tꞎ	d𝼅	c𝼆	ɟʎ̝	k𝼄	ɡʟ̝						
Lateral fricative							ɬ̪		ɬ	ɮ			ꞎ	𝼅	𝼆	ʎ̝	𝼄	ʟ̝						
Lateral approximant								l̪	l̥	l		l̠	ɭ̊	ɭ	ʎ̥	ʎ	ʟ̥	ʟ		ʟ̠				
Lateral tap/flap									ɺ̥	ɺ			𝼈̊	𝼈		ʎ̮		ʟ̆						

		BL	LD	D	A	PA	RF	P	V	U
Implosive	Voiced	ɓ			ɗ		ᶑ	ʄ	ɠ	ʛ
Implosive	Voiceless	ɓ̥			ɗ̥		ᶑ̊	ʄ̊	ɠ̊	ʛ̥
Ejective	Stop	pʼ			tʼ		ʈʼ	cʼ	kʼ	qʼ
Ejective	Affricate		p̪fʼ	t̪θʼ	tsʼ	t̠ʃʼ	tʂʼ	tɕʼ	kxʼ	qχʼ
Ejective	Fricative	ɸʼ	fʼ	θʼ	sʼ	ʃʼ	ʂʼ	ɕʼ	xʼ	χʼ
Ejective	Lateral affricate				tɬʼ			c𝼆ʼ	k𝼄ʼ	q𝼄ʼ
Ejective	Lateral fricative				ɬʼ					
Click (top: velar; bottom: uvular)	Tenuis	kʘ qʘ		kǀ qǀ	kǃ qǃ		k𝼊 q𝼊	kǂ qǂ		
Click (top: velar; bottom: uvular)	Voiced	ɡʘ ɢʘ		ɡǀ ɢǀ	ɡǃ ɢǃ		ɡ𝼊 ɢ𝼊	ɡǂ ɢǂ		
Click (top: velar; bottom: uvular)	Nasal	ŋʘ ɴʘ		ŋǀ ɴǀ	ŋǃ ɴǃ		ŋ𝼊 ɴ𝼊	ŋǂ ɴǂ	ʞ	
Click (top: velar; bottom: uvular)	Tenuis lateral				kǁ qǁ					
Click (top: velar; bottom: uvular)	Voiced lateral				ɡǁ ɢǁ					
Click (top: velar; bottom: uvular)	Nasal lateral				ŋǁ ɴǁ					
