= Nasal alveolar click =

Consonantal sound

ǃ̃ ʗ̃

Nasal alveolar velar click

ŋǃ ŋʗ

ᵑǃ ᵑʗ

Audio sample
- source · help

Nasal alveolar uvular click

ɴǃ ɴʗ

ᶰǃ ᶰʗ

An alveolar nasal click is a click consonant found primarily among the languages of southern Africa. The symbol in the International Phonetic Alphabet for a nasal alveolar click with a velar rear articulation is ⟨ŋ͡ǃ⟩ or ⟨ŋ͜ǃ⟩, commonly abbreviated to ⟨ŋǃ⟩, ⟨ᵑǃ⟩ or ⟨ǃ̃⟩; a symbol abandoned by the IPA but still preferred by some linguists is ⟨ŋ͡ʗ⟩ or ⟨ŋ͜ʗ⟩, abbreviated ⟨ŋʗ⟩, ⟨ᵑʗ⟩ or ⟨ʗ̃⟩. For a click with a uvular rear articulation, the equivalents are ⟨ɴ͡ǃ, ɴ͜ǃ, ɴǃ, ᶰǃ⟩ and ⟨ɴ͡ʗ, ɴ͜ʗ, ɴʗ, ᶰʗ⟩. Sometimes the accompanying letter comes after the click letter, e.g. ⟨ǃŋ⟩ or ⟨ǃᵑ⟩; this may be a simple orthographic choice, or it may imply a difference in the relative timing of the releases.

== Features ==
Features of an alveolar nasal click:

- The airstream mechanism is lingual ingressive (also known as velaric ingressive), which means a pocket of air trapped between two closures is rarefied by a "sucking" action of the tongue, rather than being moved by the glottis or the lungs/diaphragm. The release of the forward closure produces the "click" sound. Voiced and nasal clicks have a simultaneous pulmonic egressive airstream.
- Its place of articulation is alveolar, which means it is articulated with either the tip or the blade of the tongue at the alveolar ridge, termed respectively apical and laminal.
- Its phonation is voiced, which means the vocal cords vibrate during the articulation.
- It is a nasal consonant, which means air is exclusively allowed to escape through the nose for nasal stops; otherwise, in addition to through the mouth.
- It is a median consonant, which means it is produced by directing the airstream down the midline of the tongue, rather than to the sides.

== Occurrence ==
Alveolar nasal clicks are found primarily in the various Khoisan language families of southern Africa and in some neighboring Bantu languages such as Yeyi. They also appear in the Australian ritual language Damin.

Language	Word	IPA	Meaning
ǃKung	nǃan	[ŋ͜ǃáŋ] = [ᵑʗáŋ]	'inside'
Damin	n!aa	[ǃ̃aː] = [ʗ̃aː]	'I/me'
Hadza	henqee	[ɦeŋ͡nǃ̃eʔe] = [ɦeŋ͡nʗ̃eʔe]	'dead leopard'
Khoekhoe	xuruǃomǃnâ	[xȕɾúŋ͜ǃˀóm̀ᵑǃã̀ã̀] = [xȕɾúᵑʗˀóm̀ᵑʗã̀ã̀]	'to yank at something'
Zulu	inqola	[iɴ͜ǃɔ́ːla] = [iᶰʗɔ́ːla]	'cart'

== Glottalized alveolar nasal click ==
Glottalized alveolar nasal click

ǃ̃ˀ

ᵑǃʔ

ᵑ̊ǃˀ

ʗ̃ʔ

ᵑʗˀ

All Khoisan languages, and a few Bantu languages, have glottalized nasal clicks. These are formed by closing the glottis so that the click is pronounced in silence; however, any preceding vowel will be nasalized.

Language	Word	IPA	Meaning
Hadza	teqqe	[teŋ͡nǃ̃ˀe] = [teŋ͡nʗ̃ˀe]	'to carry'
Khoekhoe	xuruǃomǃnâ	[xȕɾúŋ͜ǃˀóm̀ᵑǃã̀ã̀] = [xȕɾúŋ͜ʗˀóm̀ᵑʗã̀ã̀]	'to yank at something'

Place →	Labial					Coronal										Dorsal					Laryngeal			
Manner ↓	Bilabial		Labiodental		Linguolabial		Dental		Alveolar		Postalveolar		Retroflex		(Alveolo-)palatal		Velar		Uvular		Pharyngeal/epiglottal		Glottal	
Nasal	m̥	m	ɱ̊	ɱ		n̼	n̪̊	n̪	n̥	n	n̠̊	n̠	ɳ̊	ɳ	ɲ̊	ɲ	ŋ̊	ŋ	ɴ̥	ɴ				
Plosive	p	b	p̪	b̪	t̼	d̼	t̪	d̪	t	d			ʈ	ɖ	c	ɟ	k	ɡ	q	ɢ	ʡ		ʔ	
Sibilant affricate							t̪s̪	d̪z̪	ts	dz	t̠ʃ	d̠ʒ	tʂ	dʐ	tɕ	dʑ								
Non-sibilant affricate	pɸ	bβ	p̪f	b̪v			t̪θ	d̪ð	tɹ̝̊	dɹ̝	t̠ɹ̠̊˔	d̠ɹ̠˔			cç	ɟʝ	kx	ɡɣ	qχ	ɢʁ	ʡʜ	ʡʢ	ʔh	
Sibilant fricative							s̪	z̪	s	z	ʃ	ʒ	ʂ	ʐ	ɕ	ʑ								
Non-sibilant fricative	ɸ	β	f	v	θ̼	ð̼	θ	ð	θ̠	ð̠	ɹ̠̊˔	ɹ̠˔	ɻ̊˔	ɻ˔	ç	ʝ	x	ɣ	χ	ʁ	ħ	ʕ	h	ɦ
Approximant		β̞		ʋ				ð̞		ɹ		ɹ̠		ɻ		j		ɰ						˷
Tap/flap		ⱱ̟		ⱱ					ɾ̥	ɾ			ɽ̊	ɽ						ɢ̆		ʡ̮		
Trill	ʙ̥	ʙ							r̥	r		r̠	ɽ̊r̥	ɽr					ʀ̥	ʀ	ʜ	ʢ		
Lateral affricate									tɬ	dɮ			tꞎ	d𝼅	c𝼆	ɟʎ̝	k𝼄	ɡʟ̝						
Lateral fricative							ɬ̪		ɬ	ɮ			ꞎ	𝼅	𝼆	ʎ̝	𝼄	ʟ̝						
Lateral approximant								l̪	l̥	l		l̠	ɭ̊	ɭ	ʎ̥	ʎ	ʟ̥	ʟ		ʟ̠				
Lateral tap/flap									ɺ̥	ɺ			𝼈̊	𝼈		ʎ̮		ʟ̆						

		BL	LD	D	A	PA	RF	P	V	U
Implosive	Voiced	ɓ			ɗ		ᶑ	ʄ	ɠ	ʛ
Implosive	Voiceless	ɓ̥			ɗ̥		ᶑ̊	ʄ̊	ɠ̊	ʛ̥
Ejective	Stop	pʼ			tʼ		ʈʼ	cʼ	kʼ	qʼ
Ejective	Affricate		p̪fʼ	t̪θʼ	tsʼ	t̠ʃʼ	tʂʼ	tɕʼ	kxʼ	qχʼ
Ejective	Fricative	ɸʼ	fʼ	θʼ	sʼ	ʃʼ	ʂʼ	ɕʼ	xʼ	χʼ
Ejective	Lateral affricate				tɬʼ			c𝼆ʼ	k𝼄ʼ	q𝼄ʼ
Ejective	Lateral fricative				ɬʼ					
Click (top: velar; bottom: uvular)	Tenuis	kʘ qʘ		kǀ qǀ	kǃ qǃ		k𝼊 q𝼊	kǂ qǂ		
Click (top: velar; bottom: uvular)	Voiced	ɡʘ ɢʘ		ɡǀ ɢǀ	ɡǃ ɢǃ		ɡ𝼊 ɢ𝼊	ɡǂ ɢǂ		
Click (top: velar; bottom: uvular)	Nasal	ŋʘ ɴʘ		ŋǀ ɴǀ	ŋǃ ɴǃ		ŋ𝼊 ɴ𝼊	ŋǂ ɴǂ	ʞ	
Click (top: velar; bottom: uvular)	Tenuis lateral				kǁ qǁ					
Click (top: velar; bottom: uvular)	Voiced lateral				ɡǁ ɢǁ					
Click (top: velar; bottom: uvular)	Nasal lateral				ŋǁ ɴǁ					
