= Nasal dental click =

Consonantal sound

ǀ̃ ʇ̃

Nasal dental velar click

ŋǀ ŋʇ

ᵑǀ ᵑʇ

Nasal dental uvular click

ɴǀ ɴʇ

ᶰǀ ᶰʇ

A dental nasal click is a click consonant found primarily among the languages of southern Africa. The symbol in the International Phonetic Alphabet for a nasal dental click with a velar rear articulation is ⟨ŋ͡ǀ⟩ or ⟨ŋ͜ǀ⟩, commonly abbreviated to ⟨ŋǀ⟩, ⟨ᵑǀ⟩ or ⟨ǀ̃⟩; a symbol abandoned by the IPA but still preferred by some linguists is ⟨ŋ͡ʇ⟩ or ⟨ŋ͜ʇ⟩, abbreviated ⟨ŋʇ⟩, ⟨ᵑʇ⟩ or ⟨ʇ̃⟩. For a click with a uvular rear articulation, the equivalents are ⟨ɴ͡ǀ, ɴ͜ǀ, ɴǀ, ᶰǀ⟩ and ⟨ɴ͡ʇ, ɴ͜ʇ, ɴʇ, ᶰʇ⟩. Sometimes the accompanying letter comes after the click letter, e.g. ⟨ǀŋ⟩ or ⟨ǀᵑ⟩; this may be a simple orthographic choice, or it may imply a difference in the relative timing of the releases.

== Features ==
Features of a dental nasal click:

- The airstream mechanism is lingual ingressive (also known as velaric ingressive), which means a pocket of air trapped between two closures is rarefied by a "sucking" action of the tongue, rather than being moved by the glottis or the lungs/diaphragm. The release of the forward closure produces the "click" sound. Voiced and nasal clicks have a simultaneous pulmonic egressive airstream.
- Its place of articulation is dental, which means it is articulated with either the tip or the blade of the tongue at the upper teeth, termed respectively apical and laminal. Note that most stops and liquids described as dental are actually denti-alveolar.
- Its phonation is voiced, which means the vocal cords vibrate during the articulation.
- It is a nasal consonant, which means air is exclusively allowed to escape through the nose for nasal stops; otherwise, in addition to through the mouth.
- It is a median consonant, which means it is produced by directing the airstream down the midline of the tongue, rather than to the sides.

== Occurrence ==
Dental nasal clicks are found primarily in the various Khoisan language families of southern Africa and in some neighboring Bantu languages, such as Yeyi and Fwe. They also appear in the Australian ritual language Damin.

Language	Word	IPA	Meaning
Damin	nh!2u	[ǀ̃\ǀ̃u] = [ʇ̃\ʇ̃u]	'dog'
Hadza	minca	[miᵑǀa] = [miᵑʇa]	'to smack one's lips'
Khoekhoe	ǀnam	[ᵑǀȁm̀] = [ᵑʇȁm̀]	'to love'
Zulu	incwancwa	[iɴ͜ǀwáːɴ͜ǀwa] = [iᶰʇwáːᶰʇwa]	'sour corn meal'

== Glottalized dental nasal click ==
Glottalized dental nasal velar click

ǀ̃ʔ

ᵑǀʔ

ᵑ̊ǀˀ

ʇ̃ˀ

ᵑʇˀ

ᵑ̊ʇˀ

All Khoisan languages, and a few Bantu languages, have glottalized nasal clicks. These are formed by closing the glottis so that the click is pronounced in silence; however, any preceding vowel will be nasalized.

Language	Word	IPA	Meaning
Hadza	tacce	[taᵑǀˀe] = [taᵑʇˀe]	'rope'
Khoekhoe	ǀoroǀoro	[ᵑǀˀòɾőᵑǀˀòɾȍ] = [ᵑʇˀòɾőᵑʇˀòɾȍ]	'to wear s.t. out'
Naro	Xgaoc’õ	[ᵏǁχao̯ᵑǀˀõ] = [ᵏʖχao̯ᵑʇˀõ]	(personal name)

Place →	Labial					Coronal										Dorsal					Laryngeal			
Manner ↓	Bilabial		Labiodental		Linguolabial		Dental		Alveolar		Postalveolar		Retroflex		(Alveolo-)palatal		Velar		Uvular		Pharyngeal/epiglottal		Glottal	
Nasal	m̥	m	ɱ̊	ɱ		n̼	n̪̊	n̪	n̥	n	n̠̊	n̠	ɳ̊	ɳ	ɲ̊	ɲ	ŋ̊	ŋ	ɴ̥	ɴ				
Plosive	p	b	p̪	b̪	t̼	d̼	t̪	d̪	t	d			ʈ	ɖ	c	ɟ	k	ɡ	q	ɢ	ʡ		ʔ	
Sibilant affricate							t̪s̪	d̪z̪	ts	dz	t̠ʃ	d̠ʒ	tʂ	dʐ	tɕ	dʑ								
Non-sibilant affricate	pɸ	bβ	p̪f	b̪v			t̪θ	d̪ð	tɹ̝̊	dɹ̝	t̠ɹ̠̊˔	d̠ɹ̠˔			cç	ɟʝ	kx	ɡɣ	qχ	ɢʁ	ʡʜ	ʡʢ	ʔh	
Sibilant fricative							s̪	z̪	s	z	ʃ	ʒ	ʂ	ʐ	ɕ	ʑ								
Non-sibilant fricative	ɸ	β	f	v	θ̼	ð̼	θ	ð	θ̠	ð̠	ɹ̠̊˔	ɹ̠˔	ɻ̊˔	ɻ˔	ç	ʝ	x	ɣ	χ	ʁ	ħ	ʕ	h	ɦ
Approximant		β̞		ʋ				ð̞		ɹ		ɹ̠		ɻ		j		ɰ						˷
Tap/flap		ⱱ̟		ⱱ					ɾ̥	ɾ			ɽ̊	ɽ						ɢ̆		ʡ̮		
Trill	ʙ̥	ʙ							r̥	r		r̠	ɽ̊r̥	ɽr					ʀ̥	ʀ	ʜ	ʢ		
Lateral affricate									tɬ	dɮ			tꞎ	d𝼅	c𝼆	ɟʎ̝	k𝼄	ɡʟ̝						
Lateral fricative							ɬ̪		ɬ	ɮ			ꞎ	𝼅	𝼆	ʎ̝	𝼄	ʟ̝						
Lateral approximant								l̪	l̥	l		l̠	ɭ̊	ɭ	ʎ̥	ʎ	ʟ̥	ʟ		ʟ̠				
Lateral tap/flap									ɺ̥	ɺ			𝼈̊	𝼈		ʎ̮		ʟ̆						

		BL	LD	D	A	PA	RF	P	V	U
Implosive	Voiced	ɓ			ɗ		ᶑ	ʄ	ɠ	ʛ
Implosive	Voiceless	ɓ̥			ɗ̥		ᶑ̊	ʄ̊	ɠ̊	ʛ̥
Ejective	Stop	pʼ			tʼ		ʈʼ	cʼ	kʼ	qʼ
Ejective	Affricate		p̪fʼ	t̪θʼ	tsʼ	t̠ʃʼ	tʂʼ	tɕʼ	kxʼ	qχʼ
Ejective	Fricative	ɸʼ	fʼ	θʼ	sʼ	ʃʼ	ʂʼ	ɕʼ	xʼ	χʼ
Ejective	Lateral affricate				tɬʼ			c𝼆ʼ	k𝼄ʼ	q𝼄ʼ
Ejective	Lateral fricative				ɬʼ					
Click (top: velar; bottom: uvular)	Tenuis	kʘ qʘ		kǀ qǀ	kǃ qǃ		k𝼊 q𝼊	kǂ qǂ		
Click (top: velar; bottom: uvular)	Voiced	ɡʘ ɢʘ		ɡǀ ɢǀ	ɡǃ ɢǃ		ɡ𝼊 ɢ𝼊	ɡǂ ɢǂ		
Click (top: velar; bottom: uvular)	Nasal	ŋʘ ɴʘ		ŋǀ ɴǀ	ŋǃ ɴǃ		ŋ𝼊 ɴ𝼊	ŋǂ ɴǂ	ʞ	
Click (top: velar; bottom: uvular)	Tenuis lateral				kǁ qǁ					
Click (top: velar; bottom: uvular)	Voiced lateral				ɡǁ ɢǁ					
Click (top: velar; bottom: uvular)	Nasal lateral				ŋǁ ɴǁ					
