= Yeyi people =

Ethnic group in Southern Africa

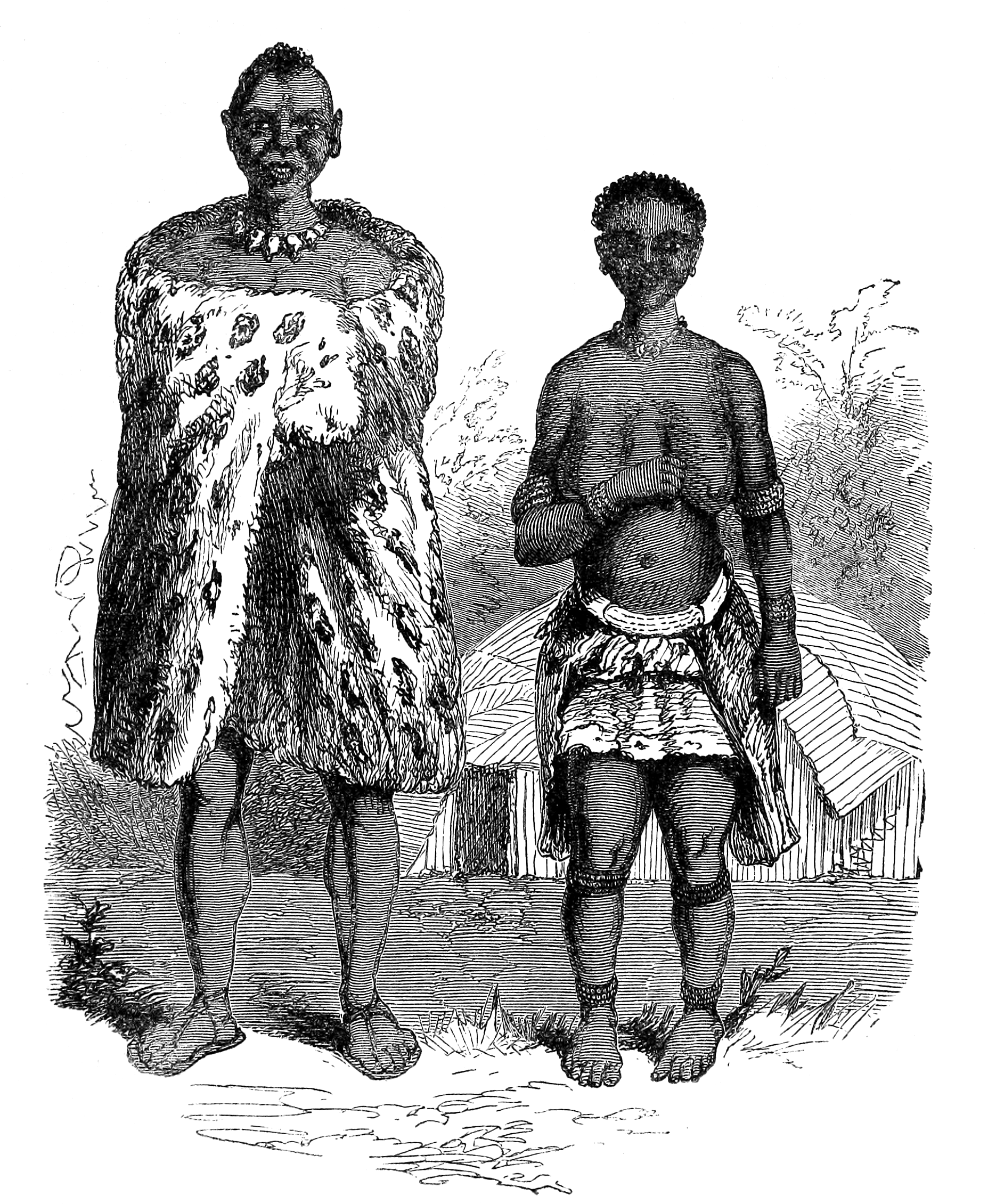
Yeyi people (described as Bayeye), 1861

The Yeyi people, also known as the Mayeyi or Bayeyi, are a Bantu-speaking ethnic group native to Southern Africa. They are part of the larger Lozi ethnic group and have significant populations in Botswana and Namibia.The Yeyi immigrated to the area in the 18th century from the north, and lived in close cooperation with the San people, or Basarwa, in particular, the Xanikhwe (otherwise known as Maghumaahi, meaning the San clan who live along riverbanks, just like the other riverine tribes such as Wayeyi and others) who had lived in the area previously. They speak ShiYeyi, a language that was influenced by the San and exhibits the characteristic clicks but Silozi is used as the formal language in official, educational, and media contexts. The Bayeyi population is 68,400.

According to oral tradition, the baYei emigrated from the kingdom of the Lozi people in the 18th century, and were led into Ngamiland by the skilled fisherman and hunter Hankuzi. When the baYei met the baKhakwe people, Hankuzi married one of their women, possibly as a guarantee of peace. A number of immigration waves followed. The baYei learned many of the baKhakwe's survival skills, including new fishing techniques, while the baYei are credited with bringing the canoe-building technology to Ngamiland. The baYei also had connections to the Lozi in the north, and traded tobacco for iron with them. Iron was important in the baYei economy for producing spearheads and tools.

In the early 19th century the baTswana tribe known as baTawana arrived in the Ngamiland. After the arrival, many of the baYei became serfs, or batlhanka, of the baTawana. Initially the servitude was voluntary in many cases, as it offered protection to attach oneself to a powerful household.

In Namibia, the Mayeyi were first recognised as an independent tribe in 1992; before they were covered under the Mafwe traditional authority. The seat of their khuta (royal homestead) is the settlement of Sangwali in the Judea Lyaboloma Constituency of the Zambezi Region. The current traditional chief, since 1993, is Chief Boniface Sifu. This is also the place where Batsara Batsapi, the annual cultural festival of the Mayeyi people, is conducted. This recognition (which was accompanied by that of the Mashi people), is not without political importance: the Mafwe were suspicious of the move since the Yeyi and the Mashi had begun shifting their political allegiance to SWAPO, the most powerful political party in Namibia, and traditional opponents of the Mafwe's desire for independence.

== Culture ==
The baYei had a matrilineal succession, i.e. the inheritor of a kingdom is the son of a sister to the king.

The baYei believed in a creator god who lived among the humans. One day the god became angry with the humans for their wickedness and went to heaven. He does not interfere much in the world, except for throwing down the occasional thunderbolt. The baYei also venerate ancestor spirits.

Crops that are important for the baYei culture includes sorghum and tobacco. Maize and sweet potatoes especially for those people in the Okavango Delta are also grown widely.
