= Pre-stopped consonant =

Type of complex consonant combining plosive with non-plosive elements

In linguistics, pre-stopping, also known as pre-occlusion or pre-plosion, is a phonological process involving the historical or allophonic insertion of a very short stop consonant before a sonorant, such as a short [d] before a nasal [n] or a lateral [l], or a short [p] before a nasal [m]. The resulting sounds ([ᵈn, ᵈl, ᵖm]) are called pre-stopped consonants, or sometimes pre-ploded or (in Celtic linguistics) pre-occluded consonants, although technically [n] may be considered an occlusive/stop without the pre-occlusion.

A pre-stopped consonant behaves phonologically as a single consonant. That is, like affricates and trilled affricates, the reasons for considering these sequences to be single consonants lies primarily in their behavior. Phonetically they are similar or equivalent to stops with a nasal or lateral release.

== Terminology ==
There are three terms for this phenomenon. The most common by far is prestopped/prestopping. In descriptions of the languages of Southeast Asia, Australia, and the Pacific, preploded/preplosion is common, though prestopped is also used. In accounts of Celtic languages, preoccluded/preocclusion is used almost exclusively. Technically, nasals are already occlusives, and are often considered stops; however, some prefer to restrict the term 'stop' for consonants in which there is complete cessation of airflow, so 'prenasalized stop' and 'prestopped nasal' are not necessarily tautologies.

== Occurrence ==
=== In European languages ===
In Manx, pre-occlusion occurs in stressed monosyllabic words (i.e. words one syllable long), and is also found in Cornish on certain stressed syllables. The inserted stop is homorganic with the sonorant, which means it has the same place of articulation. Long vowels are often shortened before pre-occluded sounds. In transcription, pre-occluding consonants in final position are typically written with a superscripted letter in Manx and in Cornish.

Examples in Manx include:

- /m/ → [ᵇm]: trome /t̪roːm/ → [t̪roᵇm] "heavy"
- /l/ → [ᵈl]: shooyll /ʃuːl/ → [ʃuːᵈl] "walking"
- /n/ → [ᵈn]: kione /kʲoːn/ → [kʲoᵈn] "head"
- /nʲ/ → [ᵈnʲ]: ein /eːnʲ/ → [eːᵈnʲ] "birds"
- /ŋ/ → [ᶢŋ]: lhong /luŋ/ → [luᶢŋ] "ship"

In Cornish, pre-occlusion mostly affects the reflexes of older geminate/fortis /m/, intrinsically geminated in Old Cornish, and /nn/ (or /N/ depending on preferred notation). It also arises in a few cases where the combination /n+j/ was apparently re-interpreted as /nnʲ/.

Examples in Cornish:

- /m#/ → [ᵇm]: mabm [mæᵇm] "mother"
- /VmV/ → [bm]: hebma [ˈhɛbmɐ] "this"
- /nn#/ → [ᵈn]: pedn [pɛᵈn] "head"
- /VnnV/ → [dn]: pednow [ˈpɛdnɔ(ʊ)] "heads"

In Faroese, pre-occlusion also occurs, as in kallar [ˈkatlaɹ] 'you call, he calls', seinna [ˈsaiːtna] 'latter'. A similar feature occurs in Icelandic, as in galli [ˈkatlɪ] ('error'); sæll [ˈsaitl̥], seinna [ˈseitna]; Spánn [ˈspautn̥].

=== In Mon–Khmer languages ===
Pre-stopped nasals are also found in several branches of Austroasiatic, especially in the North Aslian languages and Shompen, where historical word-final nasals, *m *n *ŋ, have become pre-stopped, or even full voiced stops [b d ɡ].

=== In Australian languages ===
Pre-stopped nasals and laterals are found in some Australian Aboriginal languages, such as Kuyani (Adnyamathanha), Arabana, Wangkangurru, Diyari, Aranda (nasals only), and Martuthunira (laterals only). Adnyamathanha, for example, has the pre-stopped nasals [ᵇm, ᶡɲ, ᵈ̪n̪, ᵈn, 𐞋ɳ] and the pre-stopped laterals [ᶡʎ, ᵈ̪l̪, ᵈl, 𐞋ɭ], though these are all in allophonic variation with the simple nasals and laterals [m, ɲ, n̪, n, ɳ, ʎ, l̪, l, ɭ].

=== In Austronesian languages ===
Hiw of Vanuatu is the only Austronesian language that has been reported to have a pre-stopped velar lateral approximant /ᶢʟ/. Its phonological behavior defines it as a prestopped lateral, rather than as a laterally released stop.

Nemi of New Caledonia has consonants that have been described as postnasalized stops, but could possibly be described as prestopped nasals.

== See also ==
- Nasal release
- Lateral release (phonetics)
- Prenasalized consonant
- Preaspiration

== Bibliography ==
- Eberhard, Dave (2004). "Mamaindé Pre-Stopped Nasals: An optimality account of vowel dominance and a proposal for the Identical Rhyme Constraint" (PDF). SIL Electronic Working Papers.
- François, Alexandre (2010), "Phonotactics and the prestopped velar lateral of Hiw: Resolving the ambiguity of a complex segment", Phonology, 27 (3): 393–434, doi:10.1017/s0952675710000205, S2CID 62628417
- Ladefoged, Peter; Maddieson, Ian (1996). The Sounds of the World's Languages. Oxford: Blackwell Publishers. p. 128.
- Jeff Mielke, 2008. The emergence of distinctive features.
- Ozanne-Rivierre, Françoise (1995), "Structural changes in the languages of Northern New Caledonia", Oceanic Linguistics, 34 (1): 45–72, doi:10.2307/3623111, JSTOR 3623111
