= Diaǃkwain =

San storyteller in South Africa

Díäǃkwā̦ĩn
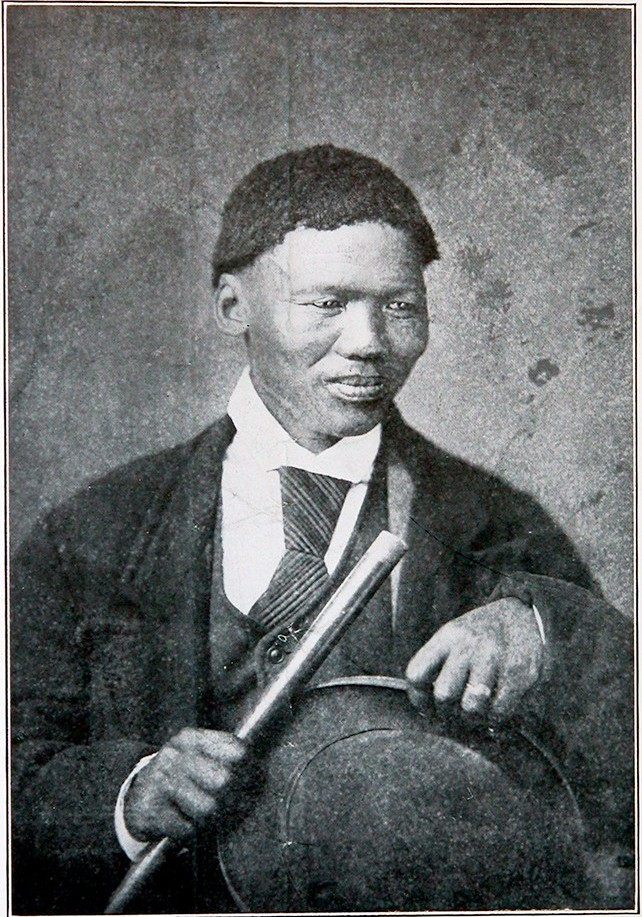
- Photograph of Díäǃkwā̦ĩn taken around 1875 during his stay with the Bleek and Lloyd household in Mowbray
- Born: 1845 ǁAnn a.k.a. Steinpits, South West of today's town Brandvlei
- Died: unknown
- Other name: Dawid Hoesar or Husar
- Occupations: hunter; ǀXam culture and knowledge informant
- Notable work: contributed to the Specimens of Bushman Folklore published by Wilhelm Bleek and Lucy Lloyd
- Spouse(s): Mietje (1st wife), then Johanna (2nd wife)
- Relatives: ǃKweiten ta ǁKen (sister); ǂKasin (brother-in-law)

Díäǃkwā̦ĩn (1845–?), from here on simplified to Diaǃkwain, (Note: Bleek & Lloyd wrote a k after a click letter when the posterior release of the click was audible. Based on the sounds attested in the closely related language Nǁng, the ⟨ǃk⟩ may therefore represent a pulmonic-contour click, though this is not certain. The tilde over the i marks the vowel as nasalized. The comma under the a indicates a "deep, rough pronunciation", specifically that it is pharyngealized. In the original transcription, all three diacritics were written wide enough to cover both vowel letters. See ǂKá̦gára and ǃHãunu for recordings of similar sounds.) was one of the most important instructors of Wilhelm Bleek and Lucy Lloyd about the now extinct ǀXam culture and language. He lived in their house in the 1870s, and through his many stories he became one of the greatest contributors of the Bleek & Lloyd collection, which features on the UNESCO's Memory of the World international register. Diaǃkwain's life is also a reflection of the genocide against the Cape San.

== Biography ==
=== Family background and childhood ===
The closest information we have about the place of Diaǃkwain's childhood was given by his sister ǃKweiten-ta-ǁKen, who identified her father's place as ǁAnn or Steinpits. Diaǃkwain described the area as a site where "gemsbok, quagga, and ostriches etc. used to drink, before the time of the Boers". and indicated that his father represented these animals through rock engravings. Janette Deacon has traced the area to the farm of Varskans, some 25 km South West of Brandvlei. Their family belonged to the ǀXam clan known as the ǃNussa ǃEʼ꞉ (Grass People).

He was the sixth child of Ꭓã́ä-ttiṅ́ (Jakob Hoesar), who is said to have been a magician, and ǂKamme-an (Annike), and appears to have had a sociable upbringing among his siblings as well as numerous aunts and uncles. He related, for example, memories of either his grandfather or another old man sharing stories to the little boys. He was close to both his parents, especially to his mother ǂKamme-an, and a lot of the stories which have been recorded from him were stories that his parents told their children as part of parental guidance about the expected behaviour and values that children should observe.

Diaǃkwain married in the mid-1860s to a ǀXam woman whose Dutch name was Mietjie, and joined her and her family who were living along the Sak River. After Mietjie's death, Diaǃkwain remarried to a woman called Johanna, and had three children.

=== Relationships with settlers and the killing of Jakob Kruger, February 1869 ===
In her notebooks, Lucy Lloyd recorded a number of incidents shared by Diaǃkwain that involved cruelty and killings of ǀXam members by Boers in the 1860s, at a time when the genocide against the Cape San was still underway. Some victims close to Diaǃkwain include his cousin and four other men; the elder brother of Diaǃkwain's friend, who was beaten to death, and later, another acquaintance of Diaǃkwain with his young son. Reasons for their killing, when specified, included "not herding the sheep well" or "getting poison to prepare his arrows for hunting springbok". These stories suggest that ǀXam communities were living in fear of the Boers.

The circumstances of the death the trekboer Jakob Kruger have been described in a 1942 article of the Afrikaner magazine Die Huisgenoot. It tells of six or seven trekboer families who were moving north into the land inhabited by the ǀXam in the summer of 1868–69. It was the rainy season and the plain was lush with abundant game. They pitched their tents near a waterhole and, according to the Huisgenoot article, had a peaceful relationship with the groups of ǀXam who lived there. After a few weeks, however, Jan Kruger noticed that six of his sheep were missing. He rode towards the huts where Diaǃkwain, his friends and their families were staying. They denied knowledge of the sheep, but (still in the Huisgenoot version) Diaǃkwain became angry and, as Kruger was riding away, shot him in the back; his brother-in-law ǂKasin fired another which struck his saddle. Wounded, Kruger tried to escape but died before reaching his camp. Skotnes provides a slightly different version, mentioning that Kruger had accused Diaǃkwain and the other men of stealing the sheep and threatened to return to their camp with his men to 'exterminate them'.

After the fatal shooting, Diaǃkwain, ǂKasin and their friends were forced to flee, but three constables were dispatched to find them and catch them. After a 30-day chase, the five were arrested and brought to a magistrate. Diaǃkwain and ǂKasin were both sentenced to five years imprisonment, a relatively mild sentence considering that theft of livestock was punished with two years imprisonment - prompting Skotnes to assume that the judge and jury believed he had acted in self-defense. Perhaps Diaǃkwain's soft manners convinced them. Indeed, Edith Bleek (Wilhelm Bleek's eldest daughter) later described Diaǃkwain as "a soft-hearted mortal, who would not, unprovoked, have hurt a fly", in high contrast to the "lust for murder" which the author of the Huisgenoot article attributed to him.

After serving four of his five-year sentence at the Breakwater convict house, Diaǃkwain was transferred to the home of Bleek and Lloyd on 29 November 1873.

=== Living with the Bleek-Lloyd household, 1874–1876 ===
Diaǃkwain stayed in Mowbray with ǂKasin until March 1874, at which date both returned home to fetch ǂKasin's wife ǃKweiten-ta-ǁKen and their children. They returned to Mowbray in June 1874, but ǃKweiten-ta-ǁKen was feeling homesick and unhappy, so she and ǂKasin left again with their children in January 1875. The next month, the Bleek and Lloyd families moved, with Diaǃkwain, from The Hill to a new house down the driveway, called Charlton House. Reports by the Bleek daughters indicate that, as time went on, he integrated well into the life of the household, enjoying the company of friends and visitors as well as Jemima Bleek's piano recitals on Sundays.

In 1875, Diaǃkwain's storytelling began in earnest and both Bleek and Lloyd recorded stories from him (see below). He was affected by the death of Wilhelm Bleek, and soon thereafter wished to send a letter to his sister in the Calvania district. He dictated it in ǀXam to Lucy Lloyd, who wrote and translated it so that Dr Meyer of Calvinia could despatch it to the farm where Diaǃkwain's sister lived. In this letter, he shares that he intended to return home, but felt unable to do so at the present time due to the grief of his "mistress" after the passing of his "master".

=== Looking for his scattered family ===
In the first week of March 1876, Diaǃkwain left the Bleek and Lloyd families and started his travels north towards home. He worked for Dr H Meyer in Calvinia for some time, then took three weeks' leave to go and visit his sister, leaving a portion of his wages with Meyer. He never came back.

Through accounts from his friend Jan Plat, we can gather that Diaǃkwain probably reunited with his wife Johanna at Klaver Vlei and worked for some time as a shepherd there, before leaving again, apparently trying to find his sons in the Orange Free State. Based on oral evidence gathered by Janette Deacon, it is likely that Diaǃkwain undertook a last journey to the land of his childhood, and was murdered there by the friends of Jakob Kruger.

== Stories and sketches ==
=== Fables about why things are the way they are ===
Among the stories which have been recorded from Diaǃkwain, a lot relate to their natural environment. There is for example a fable explaining the origin of the colours of various antelopes and mammals, by relating it to the lives of the bees, and another one which explains the black colour of the hyena by relating it to the animal falling into the fire after being challenged by the Jackal.

=== Parental guidance stories ===
A number of stories which Diaǃkwain acquired from his parents were told in a context of teaching children important values or rules. There are, for example, a number of stories meant to instill respect and fear of lions; out of respect, children were taught to not pronounce the lion's name but to rather call him "Hair".

=== Stories related to the ǃgi꞉xa (shamans) ===
In ǀXam society, there were a range of shamans (Lucy Lloyd uses the word 'sorcerers' or 'sorceresses') with different powers such as healing, bringing rain, or influencing the movement of animals. The records reveal that Diaǃkwain's mother had a strong belief in shamanism and its influence on everyday life. Diaǃkwain has related several memories of his childhood and youth where a shaman was sought out, especially to heal him as a teenager, when he was ill with a disease of the digestive system and later after he suffered an infection on a wound on his cheek.

=== Stories related to death ===
In the fortnight preceding Wilhelm Bleek's death, Diaǃkwain told several stories about his premonition of death being near – including a story about a dream that he had had two days before his father's death. After Bleek's death, the theme of death continued to haunt Diaǃkwain's stories until he left.

=== Drawings and Lament of the broken string ===
Diaǃkwain also produced animal sketches, such as the korhaan or ostriches.

He also shared a song which was sung by his father Ꭓã́ä-ttiṅ́, which Lloyd recorded as follows:

"My father sang that the string had broken. That was why things were not like that which things had formerly been... I do not hear the ringing sound [musical intonation] which I used to hear. [It means here, DH says, a ringing sound in the sky.] I feel that the string must now be that which has gone away from me."

Bank interprets this 'broken string' as a reference to "the breaking of a chain of knowledge, traditional wisdom or spiritual power that had been passed down from one generation to the other."

== Legacy ==
Many of the stories told by Diaǃkwain have been published in Specimens of Bushman Folklore (1911). Richer stories, anecdotes and accounts are recorded in the original notebooks of Wilhelm Bleek and Lucy Lloyd. They form part of the Bleek & Lloyd collection, which was added in 1997 to the UNESCO's Memory of the World international register.

The Lament of the Broken String, which was published in Specimens of Bushman Folklore, has inspired many authors. The highly evocative image of the broken string has been used by Stephen Watson as a title for his poetry book published in 1996, in which he has adapted in poetry form many of Diaǃkwain's texts. It has also inspired the title of Dr Lorato Mokwena's documentary The Broken String.

== See also ==
- Wilhelm Bleek
- Lucy Lloyd
- Dorothea Bleek
- ǃKweiten-ta-ǁKen
- ǁKabbo
- Specimens of Bushman Folklore
- ǀXam language
