= People of the Karoo =

People from area of South Africa

People of the Karoo refers to notable individuals who come (or came) from, or whose lives have included substantial engagement with, the area known as the Karoo. The Karoo is a widespread physiographic province in the western interior of South Africa, straddling much of the Northern Cape, southern Free State, Eastern Cape interior and parts of the Western Cape Provinces.

As a distinctive, generally arid region, it has given rise to a characteristic architecture, cuisine, literature and other cultural elements, with predominantly sheep farming practices, and lifestyles that included a persistence of hunting and gathering by |xam and other San (Bushman) groups into the later nineteenth century. Karoo, as place, is often acknowledged as an influential aspect in the lives or backgrounds of those people who come from or live in the region - exemplified by Guy Butler's autobiographical Karoo Morning.

Table of contents:

A B C D E F G H I J K L M N O P Q R S T U V W X Y Z

== | ==
- |A!kunta - |xam narrator in the creation of the Bleek and Lloyd archive
- |Han≠kasso - |xam narrator in the creation of the Bleek and Lloyd archive
- |Kabbo - |xam narrator in the creation of the Bleek and Lloyd archive

== ! ==
- !Kweiten ta ken - |xam narrator in the creation of the Bleek and Lloyd archive

== A ==
- André van der Merwe

== B ==
- Christiaan Barnard - pioneering heart surgeon (Beaufort West, Richmond)
- Wilhelm Heinrich Immanuel Bleek - philologist
- Guy Butler - poet

== C ==
- Fort Calata - one of the Cradock Four (Cradock)
- Sir Malcolm Campbell - land and water speed record holder who made record attempt at Verneukpan
- J. M. Coetzee - writer (Voelfontein near Merweville)

== D ==
- Coenraad de Buys - frontiersman
- Diä!kwain - |xam narrator in the creation of the Bleek and Lloyd archive

== E ==
- Abraham Esau - Coloured British patriot, Second Boer War (Calvinia)
- Cromwell Everson - composer (Beaufort West)

== F ==
- Athol Fugard - playwright, novelist, actor, and director (Middelburg)

== G ==
- Matthew Goniwe - one of the Cradock Four (Cradock)
- Robert Jacob Gordon - explorer (Orange River & Colesberg, 1778-9)

== H ==
- Albert Hoffa

== J ==
- Maximillian Jackson - magistrate (Kenhardt)

== K ==
- Cyril Karabus - former Professor of Paediatrics, UCT & Oncology, Red Cross Hospital (Beaufort West)
- James Kitching - palaeontologist (Graaff Reinet)

== M ==
- John X. Merriman - 11th and last Prime Minister of the Cape Colony and Member of Parliament for Victoria West. Merriman, a railway siding near Victoria West is named after him.
- Sicelo Mhlauli - one of the Cradock Four (Cradock)
- Sparrow Mkhonto - one of the Cradock Four (Cradock)
- Elizabeth Maria Molteno - civil and women's rights activist (Beaufort West)
- Sir John Molteno - first Prime Minister of the Cape Colony (Beaufort West)

== N ==
- Gert Vlok Nel - poet (Beaufort West)

== R ==
- Eric Rosenthal - historian and author with family connection with Middelburg
- Sydney Rubidge - palaeontologist (Graaff-Reinet)
- Anton Rupert - businessman and conservationist (Graaff-Reinet)
- Rona Rupert, née Davel - author (Calvinia)

== S ==
- Olive Schreiner
- J.L.B. Smith - ichthyologist who identified a taxidermied fish as a coelacanth (Graaff-Reinet)
- Robert Sobukwe - first president of the PAC (Graaff-Reinet and Kimberley]
- Andries Stockenstroom
- Katie Stuart (reformer) – evangelist, temperance reformer

== V ==
- Joachim van Plettenberg - visited Colesberg area in 1778
- N.P. van Wyk Louw - poet
- Zwelinzima Vavi - General Secretary of Congress of South African Trade Unions (Hanover)
- A.G. Visser - poet

== Y ==
YuGii Yo is an afrikaans rap artist, poet and activist born in the 20th century in a small town 80 kilometres outside of Beaufort West.
