= Centre for Curating the Archive =

Research centre at the University of Cape Town

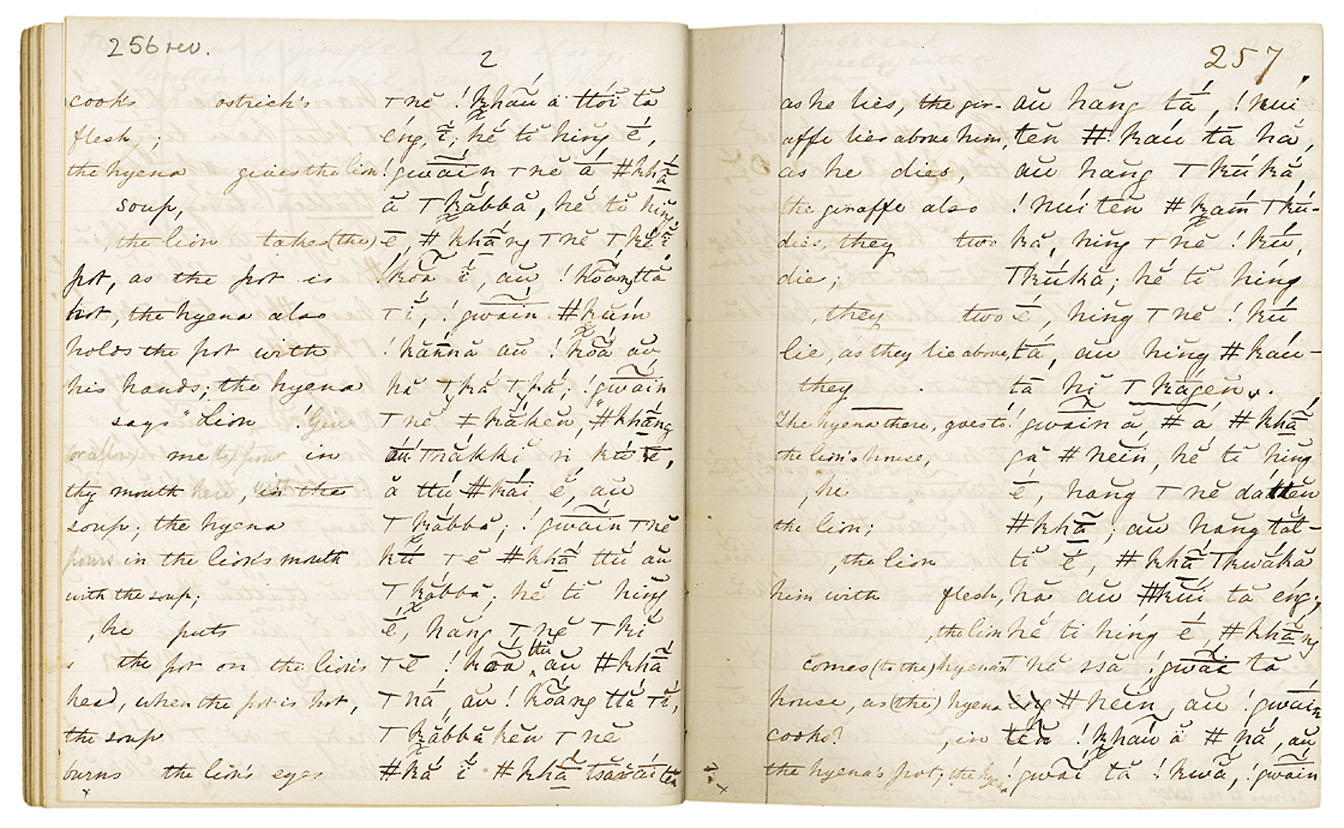
- The lion and giraffe story relayed by kabbo and recorded in one of Lucy Lloyd's xam notebooks.
- Parent institution: University of Cape Town
- Founder: Pippa Skotnes
- Established: 1996
- Mission: Research and education
- Focus: Curatorship, archives
- President: Fritha Langerman
- Formerly called: Lucy Lloyd Archive, Resource and Exhibition Centre (LLAREC)
- Address: Old Medical School Building, Hiddingh Campus, University of Cape Town
- Location: Cape Town, South Africa
- Website: https://humanities.uct.ac.za/cca

The Centre for Curating the Archive (CCA) is a research centre at the University of Cape Town.

== Background ==
The CCA began as the Lucy Lloyd Archive, Resource and Exhibition Centre (LLAREC) in 1996 at the Michaelis School of Fine Art. Its establishment followed two Pippa Skotnes exhibitions related to xam folklore—"Sound from the Thinking Strings" (1991) at the South African Museum, and "Miscast: Negotiating Khoisan Identity and Material Culture" (1996) at the South African National Gallery. The exhibitions led to books, both of which were edited by Skotnes—Sound from the Thinking Strings: Visual, Literary and Archaeological and Historical Interpretation of the Final Years of /Xam Li (1991, Axeage Private Press) and Miscast: Negotiating the Presence of the Bushmen (1996, UCT Press). Various academics contributed chapters on issues related to "Khoesan studies".

LLAREC was named for Lucy Lloyd and her contributions to the Bleek and Lloyd collection of xam and !kun folklore and linguistic data. LLAREC was later renamed the Centre for Curating the Archive.

In 2008, the centre established a photographic unit.

== Projects ==
=== Partnerships ===
The CCA works with several institutions in the realisation of its projects and curates exhibitions both in South Africa and abroad. The CCA collaborates with Iziko Museums of South Africa in the delivery of the BA Honours in Curatorship programme.

=== The Digital Bleek and Lloyd ===
The CCA began digitising Bleek and Lloyd collection materials on a large scale in 2003. A digital library system was developed for the collection by members of UCT's Digital Libraries Laboratory. The digital Bleek and Lloyd contains a 280 000-word searchable index, and consolidates materials held by the University of Cape Town, University of South Africa, Iziko South African Museum, and the National Library of South Africa. As of 2024, the Digital Bleek and Lloyd is in the process of being reconfigured and relaunched.
