= ǃKweiten ta ǁKen =

Chronicler of ǀxam culture and knowledge

ǃKwéite̥n ta ǁKēn
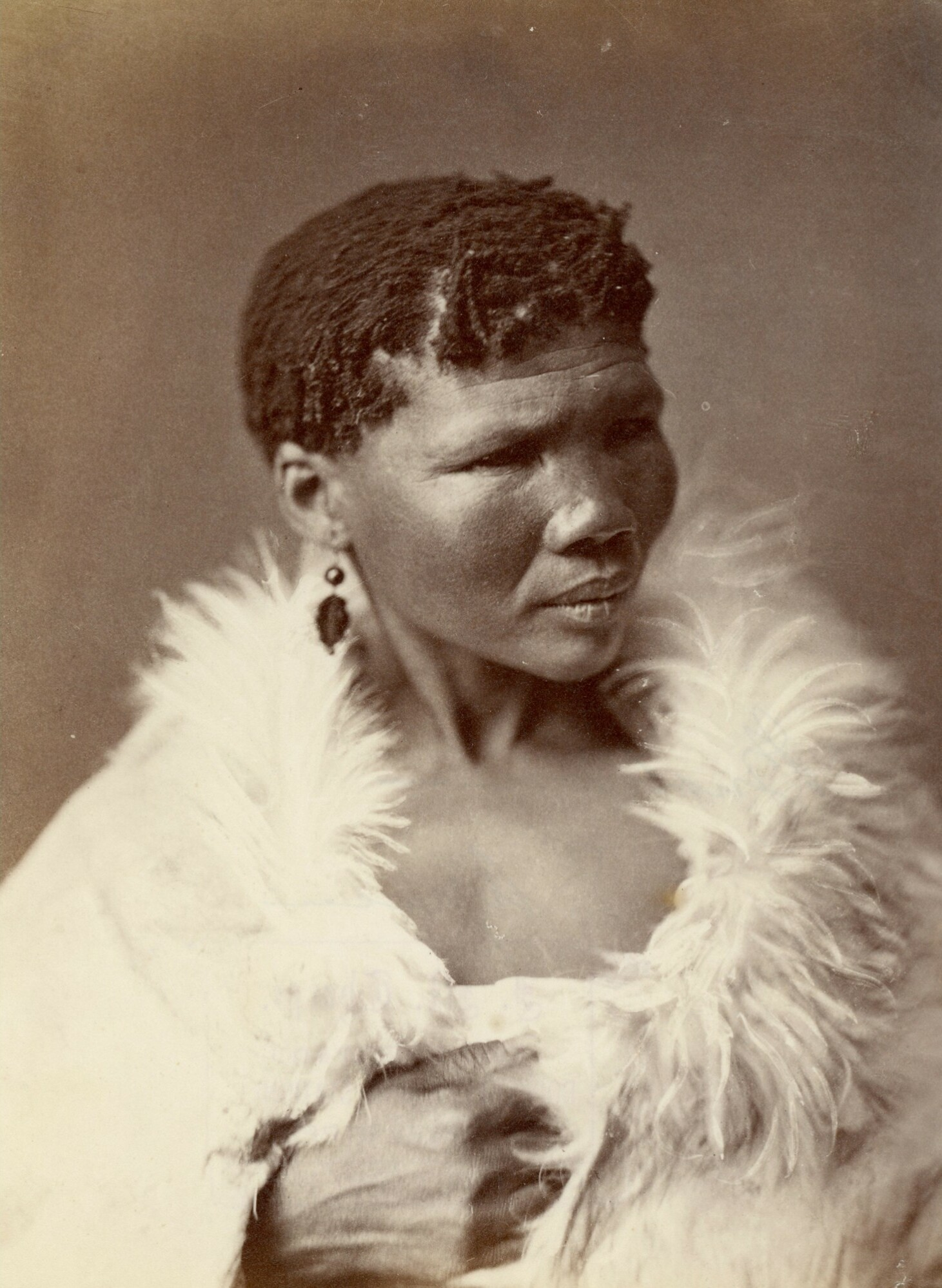
- Born: c. late 1840s Katkop mountains, South West of Brandvlei in today's Northern Cape of South Africa
- Died: after 1875
- Other name: Rachel or Griet
- Known for: her unique contributions to the Bleek & Lloyd collection on xam culture
- Spouse(s): ǂKasin (himself an instructor of Wilhelm Bleek and Lucy Lloyd)
- Children: 5
- Relatives: Diaǃkwāin, brother, one of Bleek and Lloyd's most prominent instructors.

ǃKwéite̥n ta ǁKēn (English pronunciation /ˈkweɪtən tə ˈkɛn/ KWAY-tən tə KEN (Note: Bleek & Lloyd wrote a k after a click letter when the posterior release was audible. Based on the sounds attested in the closely related language Nǁng, ⟨ǃk⟩ and ⟨ǁk⟩ may therefore represent pulmonic-contour clicks, though this is not certain. The ring under the e indicates that it was pronounced very short.)), also known as Rachel or Griet, was a noted ǀXam chronicler of ǀXam culture and knowledge. Although her contributions to the Bleek and Lloyd archive of Specimens of Bushman Folklore have been limited in quantity, she played an important role in providing a female perspective on the life, rituals, and beliefs of ǀXam society.

== Origins and family ==
ǃKwéite̥n ta ǁKēn was the youngest of seven children of Ꭓã́ä-ttiṅ́ and ǂAmme-an, and sister of Diaǃkwain, who was one of Bleek and Lloyd's main informants. She would have been born in the late 1840s. Her name was said to mean 'orphan's child' and refer to her mother's feelings at the time of her birth, having just lost her own mother.

ǃKwéite̥n ta ǁKēn was from the Katkop mountains and identified her father's place as ǁAnn or Steinpits, which Janette Deacon has traced back to the farm of Kans or Vaskans of today, South West of the town of Brandvlei in what is today the Northern Cape province of South Africa. Based on the extensive interviews of her brother Diaǃkwain, we know that they had a sociable upbringing.

== Married life and ǂKasin's arrest ==
ǃKwéite̥n ta ǁKēn's husband ǂKasin, or Klaas Katkop, was also an informant for Bleek and Lloyd. He was of mixed ethnic origin, his father being a Korana and his mother a ǀXam. After the marriage, they lived with ǂKasin's family further north. She had six children, two of whom died young.

ǂKasin reported an incident during a hunt, in which he was bitten in the arm by a leopard and seriously injured. Banks speculates that this injury may have forced him and his family to join camp with ǃKwéite̥n ta ǁKēn's brother Diaǃkwain, some 30 km further south. It is at that time that Diaǃkwain and ǂKasin were apparently involved in the killing of a trekboer, Jacob Kruger, in circumstances that remain controversial. The two men were arrested and sentenced to five years imprisonment. During their prison term at the Breakwater Convict Station, they met Wilhelm Bleek who was looking for ǀXam informants for his research on the ǀXam language and folklore. ǂKasin was transferred to The Hill, the house of the Bleek-Lloyd family in Mowbray, where he stayed from November 1873 until March 1874.

During ǂKasin's time in captivity, ǃKwéite̥n ta ǁKēn was left alone with her children. She took up with another man who gave her another son, Gert. Gert’s father, however, died before ǂKasin’s release. ǃKwéite̥n ta ǁKēn was reunited with her first husband when he returned to his homeland at the beginning of April.

== Stay at The Hill, Mowbray, 1874-75 ==
In June 1874, ǂKasin and ǃKwéite̥n ta ǁKēn travelled together to the Cape with two of her children. Two other children joined them later. That is how she had the opportunity to stay at The Hill, the Bleek & Lloyd house in Mowbray, for approximately six months. However, the Bleek daughters recall her being unhappy and homesick. Nonetheless, during her last month at the Cape, she was interviewed by Lucy Lloyd, sister-in-law of Wilhelm Bleek, and the interview records provide precious evidence about the cultural practices relating to the lives of ǀXam girls and young women. In January 1875, ǃKwéite̥n ta ǁKēn, ǂKasin and their family returned home.

== Contributions ==
ǃKwéite̥n ta ǁKēn was the only significant female instructor who was interviewed at The Hill and Lucy Lloyd interviewed her for a period of less than two weeks, filling two notebooks. The records betray a sense of discomfort felt by ǃKwéite̥n ta ǁKēn. While the extent of her records is rather modest compared to the main male informants such as ǁKabbo and her brother Diaǃkwain, it is significant for the specific focus of her contribution. One important theme, on which she could comment from her personal experience, related to the ritual of secluding 'new maidens', i.e. young women at the time of their first menstruation, as well as the rain animal which is associated to them. She also shared stories about the foolishness of men and a story about the Leopard Tortoise, among others.

== See also ==
- Wilhelm Bleek
- Lucy Lloyd
- Diaǃkwain
- ǁKabbo
- Specimens of Bushman Folklore
