= ǀXam language =

Extinct language of South Africa and Lesotho

ǀXam
- ǀKham, ǀKhuai
- ǀXam-ka ǃei
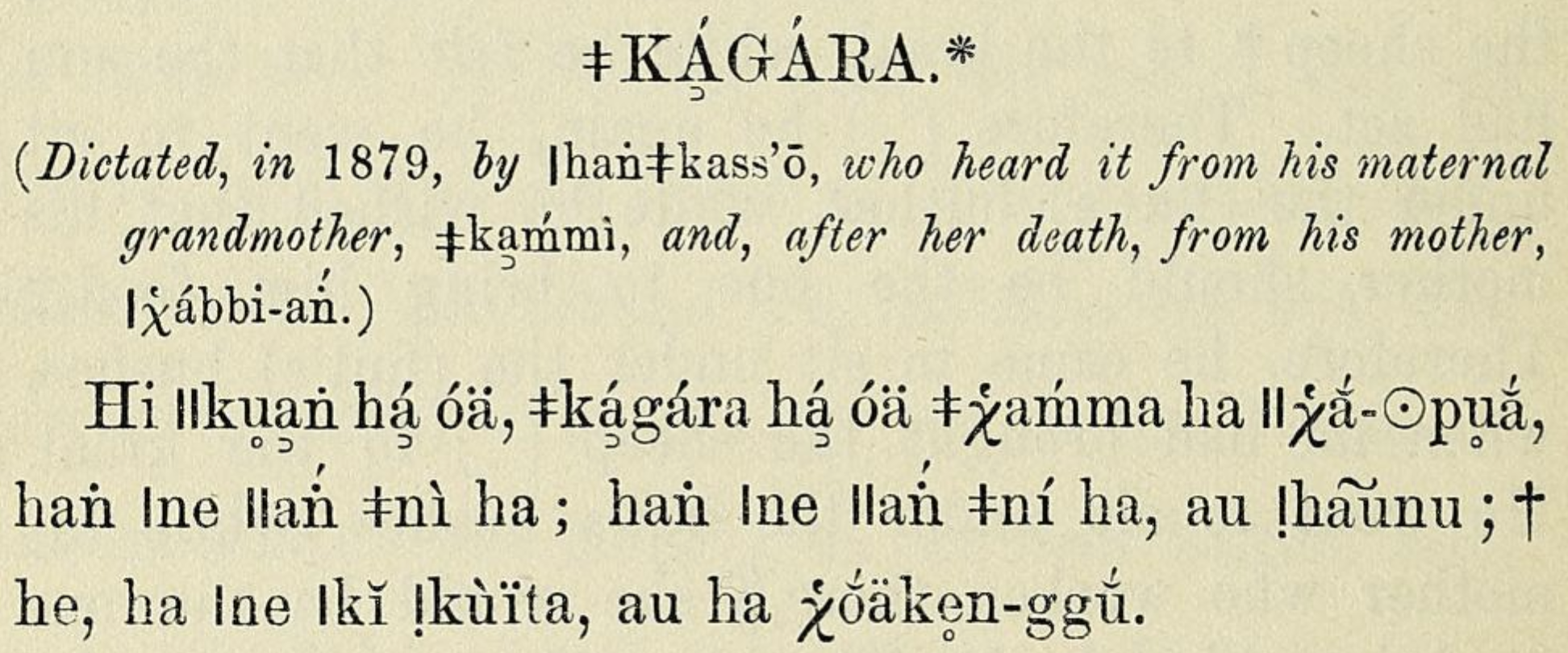
- First line of the ǀXam story "ǂKá̦gára" in W. H. I. Bleek and L. Lloyd, Specimens of Bushman Folklore, 1911
- Pronunciation: [ǀ͡xam]
- Native to: South Africa, Lesotho
- Ethnicity: ǀXam
- Extinct: 1910s
- Language family: Tuu: ǃKwi; ǀXam
- Writing system: transcribed in Latin script

Language codes
- ISO 639-3: xam
- Glottolog: xamm1241

- People: ǀXam
- Language: ǀXam-ka ǃei
- Country: ǀXam-ka ǃau

ǀXam (pronounced [ǀ͡kxam], ǀXam: ǀXam-ka ǃei, in English as /ˈkɑːm/ KAHM) is an extinct language (or possibly cluster of languages) from South Africa formerly spoken by the ǀXam people. It is part of the ǃUi branch of the Tuu languages and closely related to the moribund Nǁng and Tumʔi languages, the latter of which might be at least partially composed of words from ǀXam. Apart from the possibility of it continuing as Tumʔi, the last known speakers died in the 1910s.

Much of the scholarly work on ǀXam was performed by Wilhelm Bleek and Lucy Lloyd. Wilhelm Bleek, a German linguist of the 19th century based in Cape Town, first studied a variety of ǀXam spoken at Achterveld. Later, he and Lloyd spent decades working with ǁkabbo, Diaǃkwāin, ǀaǃkúṅta, ǃkweiten-ta-ǁken, ǀhaṅǂkassʼō and other speakers to document the dialects spoken by the clans in the area of the Strandberg (Clan of the 'Plain people') and Katkop mountains (Clan of the 'Grass People'), and to capture their stories and mythology. The surviving corpus of ǀXam comes from the stories told by and vocabulary recorded from these individuals in the Bleek and Lloyd Collection. A number of them was published in 1911 under Specimens of Bushman Folklore.

== Name ==
The pipe at the beginning of the name "ǀXam" represents a dental click, like the English interjection tsk, tsk! used to express pity or shame. The ⟨x⟩ denotes a voiceless velar fricative click accompaniment.

Compared to other Khoisan languages, there is little variation in rendering the name, though it is sometimes seen with the simple orthographic variant ǀKham, as well as a different grammatical form, ǀKhuai.

== Doculects ==
Güldemann (2019) lists the following doculects as being well-enough attested to identify as ǀXam.

Label	Researcher	Date	Origin	Notes
Nǀuusaa	Krönlein	1850s	Lower Orange River	= D. Bleek label SVIa.
Nǀusa	Lloyd	1880	Middle Orange River	
ǀXam	W. Bleek	1866	Achterveld	= Bleek label SI.
ǀXam	W. Bleek/Lloyd	1870s	Karoo (Strandberg-Katkop)	= Bleek label SI.
ǃUi	W. Bleek	1857	Colesberg	
ǃUi	W. Bleek	1857	Burghersdorp	
ǃUi	Lloyd	1880	Aliwal North	

Nǀusa is clearly ǀXam, but Güldemann includes the three eastern ǃUi doculects (extending to Lesotho) under the term "Wider ǀXam".

== Phonology ==
=== Consonants ===
Compared to other Tuu languages like Taa, ǀXam has a more restricted inventory of consonants particularly the clicks, where there are only 8 series of click accompaniments, far fewer than East ǃXoon Taa's 18. A preliminary consonant inventory of ǀXam, including egressive stops, fricatives, and affricates as well as ingressive clicks, is listed below.

Reconstructed ǀXam consonants
		Egressive				Ingressive				
		Labial	Alveolar	Dorsal	Glottal	Labial	Dental	Lateral	Alveolar	Palatal
Nasal	plain	m	n	ŋ		ᵑʘ	ᵑǀ	ᵑǁ	ᵑǃ	ᵑǂ
Nasal	Glottalized					ᵑʘˀ	ᵑǀˀ	ᵑǁˀ	ᵑǃˀ	ᵑǂˀ
Nasal	Delayed aspiration					ᵑʘh	ᵑǀh	ᵑǁh	ᵑǃh	ᵑǂh
Plosive	tenuis	(p)	t	k	ʔ	ᵏʘ	ᵏǀ	ᵏǁ	ᵏǃ	ᵏǂ
Plosive	voiced	b	d	ɡ	ʔ	ᶢʘ	ᶢǀ	ᶢǁ	ᶢǃ	ᶢǂ
Affricate	Aspirated		t͡sʰ	k͡x		ʘ͡kʰ	ǀ͡kʰ	ǁ͡kʰ	ǃ͡kʰ	ǂ͡kʰ
Affricate	Velar frication		tx~t͡sx	k͡x		ʘ͡kx	ǀ͡kx	ǁ͡kx	ǃ͡kx	ǂ͡kx
Affricate	Ejective/Ejective contour		tʼ~t͡sʼ	k͡xʼ		ʘ͡kxʼ	ǀ͡kxʼ	ǁ͡kxʼ	ǃ͡kxʼ	ǂ͡kxʼ
Fricative			s	x	h					
Sonorant		w	ɾ~l	j						

=== Vowels ===
The five vowel sounds are noted as [i e a o u] and are found with nasalization [ĩ ẽ ã õ ũ], pharyngealization [ḭ ḛ a̰ o̰ ṵ], and glottalization [iˀ eˀ aˀ oˀ uˀ].

=== Speech of mythological characters ===
Bleek notes that particular animal figures in ǀXam mythology have distinctive speech patterns. For example, Tortoise substitutes clicks with labial non-clicks, Mongoose replaces clicks with ts, tsy, ty, dy etc., and Jackal makes use of a "strange" labial click, "which bears to the ordinary labial click ʘ, a relation in sound similar to that which the palatal click ǂ bears to the cerebral click ǃ". The Moon, and perhaps Hare and Anteater, even use "a most unpronounceable" click in place of all clicks save the bilabial. Other changes noted include the Blue Crane's speech, who ends the first syllable of almost every word with a /t/.

==== "Fragment about the animal clicks and ways of speaking Bushman" ====
- The jackal has a flat lip click.
- A kind of side click in the middle of the mouth. (referring to the jackal?)
- The moon has the joint of the tongue being turned up and back to the roof of the mouth. This click has a kind of palatal click with it.
- The lion talks with a (?) side click and a (?) guttural with it.
- The hyena has a flat click.

== Motto of South Africa ==
The coat of arms of South Africa, with the motto in reconstructed ǀXam

ǀXam is used for the motto on the coat of arms of South Africa, which was adopted on 27 April 2000:

ǃke e꞉ ǀxarra ǁke

The intended meaning is Diverse people unite or, on a collective scale, Unity in Diversity. The word-for-word translation is people who are different meet. However, it is not known if that phrase would have been idiomatic in ǀXam. (Note: Bleek's Bushman Dictionary records ǃkʼe e꞉ ǀxarra with the meaning 'strangers'.) Because it is extinct, ǀXam is not one of the twelve official languages of South Africa.

== See also ==
- Wilhelm Bleek
- Lucy Lloyd
- Dorothea Bleek
- ǁKabbo
- Specimens of Bushman Folklore
