= Wilhelm Bleek =

German linguist (1827–1875)

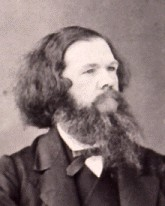
- Born: 8 March 1827; Berlin, German Confederation
- Died: 17 August 1875 (aged 48); Mowbray, Cape Colony (now South Africa)
- Burial place: Wynberg Cemetery
- Occupations: Linguist, philologist
- Children: 5, including Dorothea
- Father: Friedrich Bleek
- Relatives: Ernst Haeckel (cousin)

Wilhelm Heinrich Immanuel Bleek (8 March 1827 – 17 August 1875) was a German linguist who lived in the Cape Colony (modern-day South Africa) and developed a particular interest for the languages and culture of the San peoples. He is the author of A Comparative Grammar of South African Languages. His great project, jointly executed with Lucy Lloyd in collaboration with San individuals who came to stay at his house for months or years, is the Bleek and Lloyd Archive of ǀXam and ǃKung texts, which has been listed on UNESCO's Memory of the World register. A collection of these texts eventually reached press with Specimens of Bushman Folklore. Bleek was influenced by scientific racism and this is reflected in some of his scientific practices and theories.

== Early life and career ==
Wilhelm Heinrich Immanuel Bleek was born in Berlin on 8 March 1827. He was the eldest son of Friedrich Bleek, Professor of Theology at Berlin University and then at the University of Bonn, and Auguste Charlotte Marianne Henriette Sethe. He was also the cousin of zoologist Ernst Haeckel, one of the great promoters of scientific racism in Germany. Bleek graduated from the University of Bonn in 1851 with a doctorate in linguistics, after a period in Berlin where he went to study Hebrew and where he first became interested in African languages. Bleek's thesis featured an attempt to link North African and Khoikhoi (or what were then called Hottentot) languages – the thinking at the time being that all African languages were connected. After graduating in Bonn, Bleek returned to Berlin and worked with a zoologist, Dr Wilhelm K H Peters, editing vocabularies of East African languages. His interest in African languages was further developed during 1852 and 1853 by learning Egyptian Arabic from Professor Karl Richard Lepsius, whom he met in Berlin in 1852.

Bleek was appointed official linguist to Dr William Balfour Baikie's Niger Tshadda Expedition in 1854. Ill-health (a tropical fever) forced his return to England where he met George Grey and John William Colenso, the Anglican Bishop of Natal, who invited Bleek to join him in Natal in 1855 to help compile a Zulu grammar. After completing Colenso's project, Bleek travelled to Cape Town in 1857 to catalogue Sir George Grey's vast private library. Grey had philological interests and was Bleek's patron during his time as Governor of the Cape. The two had a good professional and personal relationship based on an admiration that appears to have been mutual. Bleek was widely respected as a philologist, particularly in the Cape. While working for Grey he continued with his philological research and contributed to various publications during the late 1850s. Bleek requested examples of African literature from missionaries and travellers, such as the Revd W Kronlein who provided Bleek with Namaqua texts in 1861.

In 1859 Bleek briefly returned to Europe in an effort to improve his poor health but returned to the Cape and his research soon after. In 1861 Bleek met his future wife, Jemima Lloyd, at the boarding house where he lived in Cape Town (run by a Mrs Roesch), while she was waiting for a passage to England, and they developed a relationship through correspondence. She returned to Cape Town from England the following year.

Bleek married Jemima Lloyd on 22 November 1862. After living in central Cape Town, the Bleeks settled in the then still rural area of Mowbray in 1866. There, they first lived at The Hill but moved in 1875 to Charlton House. Jemima's sister, Lucy Lloyd, joined the household in the late 1860s, became his colleague, and carried on his work after his death.

When Grey was appointed Governor of New Zealand in November 1861, he presented his collection to the National Library of South Africa on condition that Bleek be its curator, a position he occupied from 1862 until his death in 1875. In addition to this work, Bleek supported himself and his family by writing regularly for Het Volksblad throughout the 1860s and publishing the first part of his A Comparative Grammar of South African Languages in London in 1862. The second part was also published in London in 1869 with the first chapter appearing in manuscript form in Cape Town in 1865. Unfortunately, much of Bleek's working life in the Cape, like that of his sister-in-law after him, was characterised by extreme financial hardship which made his research even more difficult to continue with.

== San people ==
Bleek's first contact with San people (Bushmen) was with prisoners at Robben Island and the Cape Town Gaol and House of Correction, in 1857. He conducted interviews with a few of these prisoners, which he used in later publications. These people all came from the Burgersdorp and Colesberg regions and spoke variations of one similar-sounding "Bushman" language. Bleek was particularly keen to learn more about this "Bushman" language and compare it to examples of "Bushman" vocabulary and language earlier noted by Hinrich Lichtenstein and obtained from missionaries at the turn of the 19th century.

In 1863 resident magistrate Louis Anthing introduced the first ǀxam-speakers to Bleek. He brought three men to Cape Town from the Kenhardt district to stand trial for attacks on farmers (the prosecution was eventually waived by the Attorney General). In 1866 two San prisoners from the Achterveldt near Calvinia were transferred from the Breakwater prison to the Cape Town prison, making it easier for Bleek to meet them. With their help, Bleek compiled a list of words and sentences and an alphabetical vocabulary. Most of these words and sentences were provided by Adam Kleinhardt (see Bleek I-1, UCT A1.4.1).

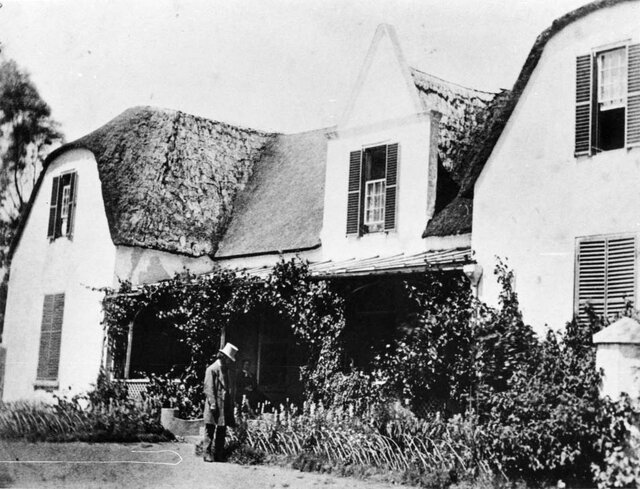
The Hill in Mowbray in the early 1870s when the Bleeks lived there and where many of the ǀxam instructors interviews occurred

In 1870 Bleek and Lloyd, by now working together on the project to learn "Bushman" language and record personal narratives and folklore, became aware of the presence of a group of 28 ǀxam prisoners (San from the central interior of southern Africa) at the Breakwater Convict Station and received permission to relocate one prisoner to their home in Mowbray so as to learn his language. The prison chaplain, Revd Fisk, was in charge of the selection of this individual – a young man named ǀaǃkunta, aged between 18 and 20. From August 1870, Bleek and Lloyd worked with ǀaǃkunta and started recording initial samples of ǀxam language and establishing vocabulary lists. However, ǀa!kunta was unfamiliar with much of his people's folklore and an older man named ǁkabbo was then permitted to join him at The Hill from February 1871. ǁKabbo became Bleek and Lloyd's most prolific teacher, a title by which he later regarded himself. Over time, members of ǁkabbo's family and other families lived with Bleek and Lloyd in Mowbray, and were interviewed by them. Amongst the people interviewed by Bleek were ǂkasin and his wife ǃkweiten ta ǁken, as well as Dia!kwain. Many of the ǀxam-speakers interviewed by Bleek and Lloyd were related to one another. Bleek and Lloyd learned and wrote down their language, first as lists of words and phrases and then as stories and narratives about their lives, history, folklore and remembered beliefs and customs.

Bleek, along with Lloyd, made an effort to record as much anthropological and ethnographic information as possible. This included genealogies, places of origin, and the customs and daily life of the informants. Photographs and measurements (some as specified by Thomas Huxley's global ethnographic project, see Godby 1996) were also taken of many of their informants, often going beyond what was the norm of scientific research of the time in those fields. More intimate and personal painted portraits were also commissioned of some of the ǀxam teachers.

Although Bleek and Lloyd interviewed other individuals (Lloyd doing this alone after Bleek's death in 1875), most of their time was spent interviewing only six individual ǀxam contributors. Bleek wrote a series of reports on the language and the literature and folklore of the ǀxam-speakers he interviewed, which he sent to the Cape Secretary for Native Affairs. This was first in an attempt to gain funding to continue with his studies and then also to make Her Majesty's Colonial Government aware of the need to preserve San folklore as an important part of the nation's heritage and traditions.

== Death ==
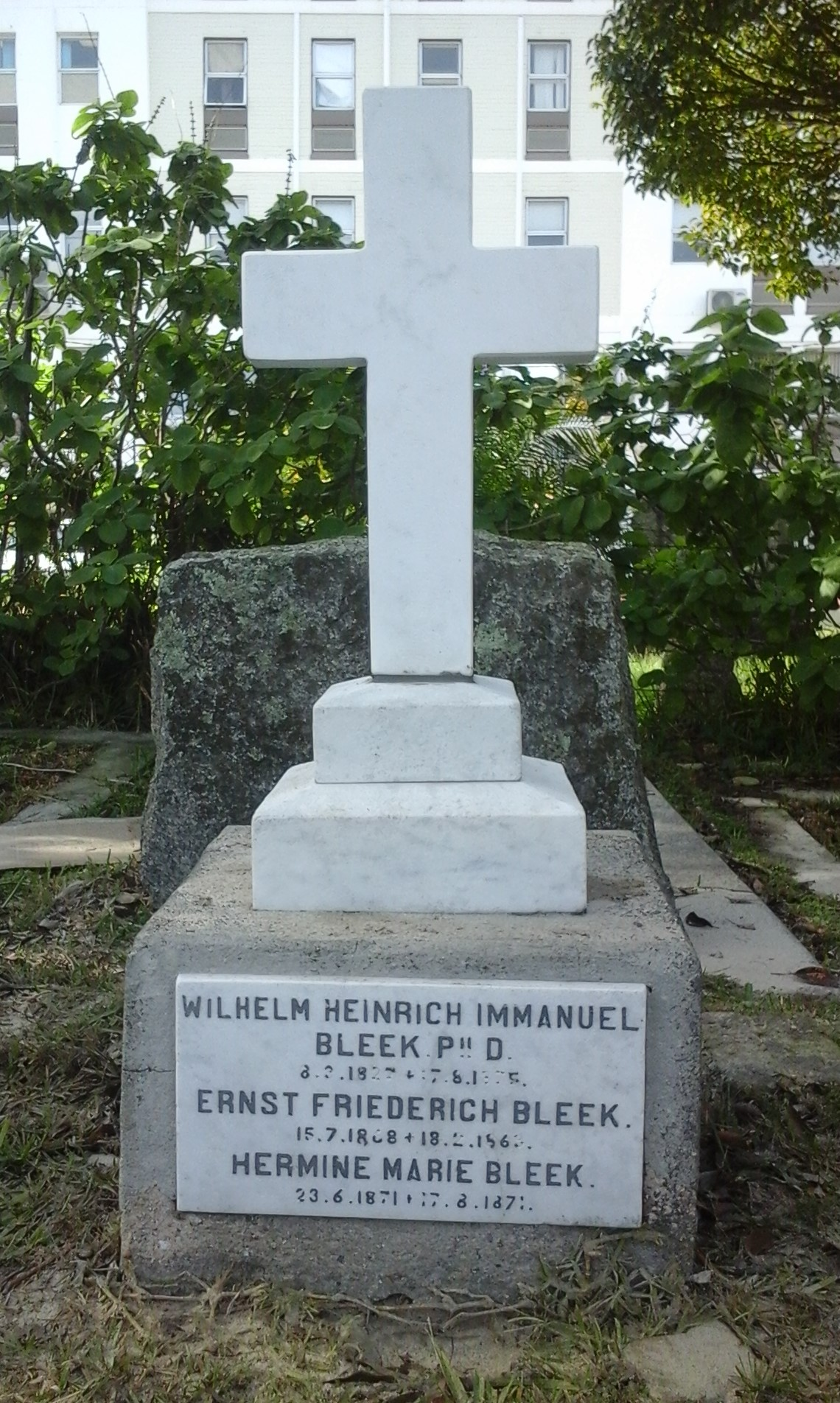
Wilhelm Bleek's grave, Wynberg Cemetery, Cape Town

Bleek, who had contracted tuberculosis already in the late 1850s, died of a chest hemorrhage died in Mowbray on 17 August 1875, aged 48, and was buried in Wynberg Anglican cemetery in Cape Town along with his two infant children, who had died before him. His all-important work recording the ǀxam language and literature was continued and expanded by Lucy Lloyd, fully supported by his wife Jemima. In his obituary in the South African Mail of 25 August 1875, he was lauded in the following terms: "As a comparative philologist he stood in the foremost rank, and as an investigator and authority on the South African languages, he was without peer."

== Bleek & Lloyd collection ==
The Bleek collection, now called Bleek & Lloyd collection, is an archive of papers about the San people by Bleek, his daughter Dorothea, Lucy Lloyd, and G. W. Stow. It also includes photographic albums. These materials are held at the University of Cape Town Libraries and in the special collections of the South African Library, also in Cape Town. In 1997 this archive was added by UNESCO to its Memory of the World international register, recognising it as documentary heritage of global importance. Since 2006 the collection has been made available digitally as the ǃkhwe ta ǀxōë: Digital Bleek and Lloyd collection. It has been extended in multiple iterations and currently includes manuscript dictionaries, correspondence, photographs, drafts of publications, various research materials and other documents related to the Bleek and Lloyd families.

== Legacy ==
Although Wilhelm Bleek has been acclaimed for his foundational role in South African linguistics and ethnography and particularly his documentation of San language and culture, his legacy is increasingly being examined through a more critical lens. Andrew Banks argues that there is a need to confront his embedded 19th-century racial theories, evolutionary biases, and editorial censorship that sanitized Indigenous narratives. Modern scholars now work to deconstruct and reclaim the limited and biased view of Khoi and San culture promoted by his work.

== See also ==
- Lucy Lloyd
- Dorothea Bleek
- ǃkweiten ta ǁken
- ǁkabbo
- Dia!kwain
