= V&A Waterfront =

Commercial and residential part of Cape Town around the old harbour

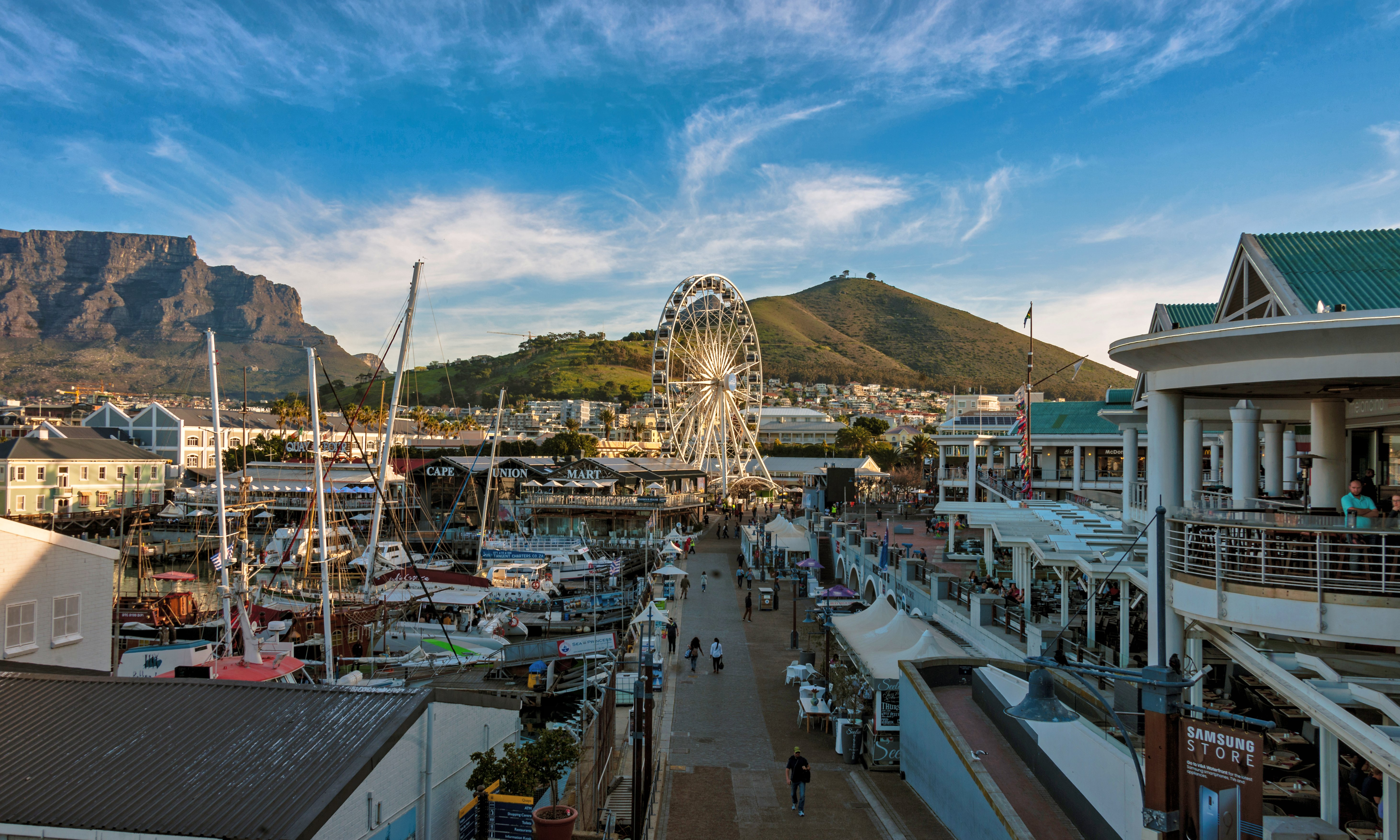
- Signal Hill and ferris wheel from Victoria Wharf

Project
- Website: waterfront.co.za

Physical features
- Divisions: Roggebaai Canal, Alfred Basin, Victoria Basin, Duncan Dock, Granger Bay

Location
- Interactive map of V&A Waterfront
- Coordinates: 33°54′11″S 18°25′22″E
- Country: South Africa
- City: Cape Town
- Location: City Bowl

Area
  - Total: 123 ha (300 acres)

The V&A Waterfront, often referred to as The Waterfront and The V&A, is a mixed-use suburb in Cape Town, South Africa, featuring upmarket residential apartments, a major shopping mall, a marina, and multiple large hotels.

The Waterfront sits on the site of the oldest working harbor in the Southern Hemisphere. With Table Mountain as its backdrop, the 123-hectare neighbourhood sees millions of people visiting each year. The V&A Waterfront is Cape Town's most popular tourist destination by number of visitors per year.

The mall is one of Cape Town's largest, and the Waterfront features numerous other retail spaces, including the Watershed, and Alfred Mall.

== Properties ==
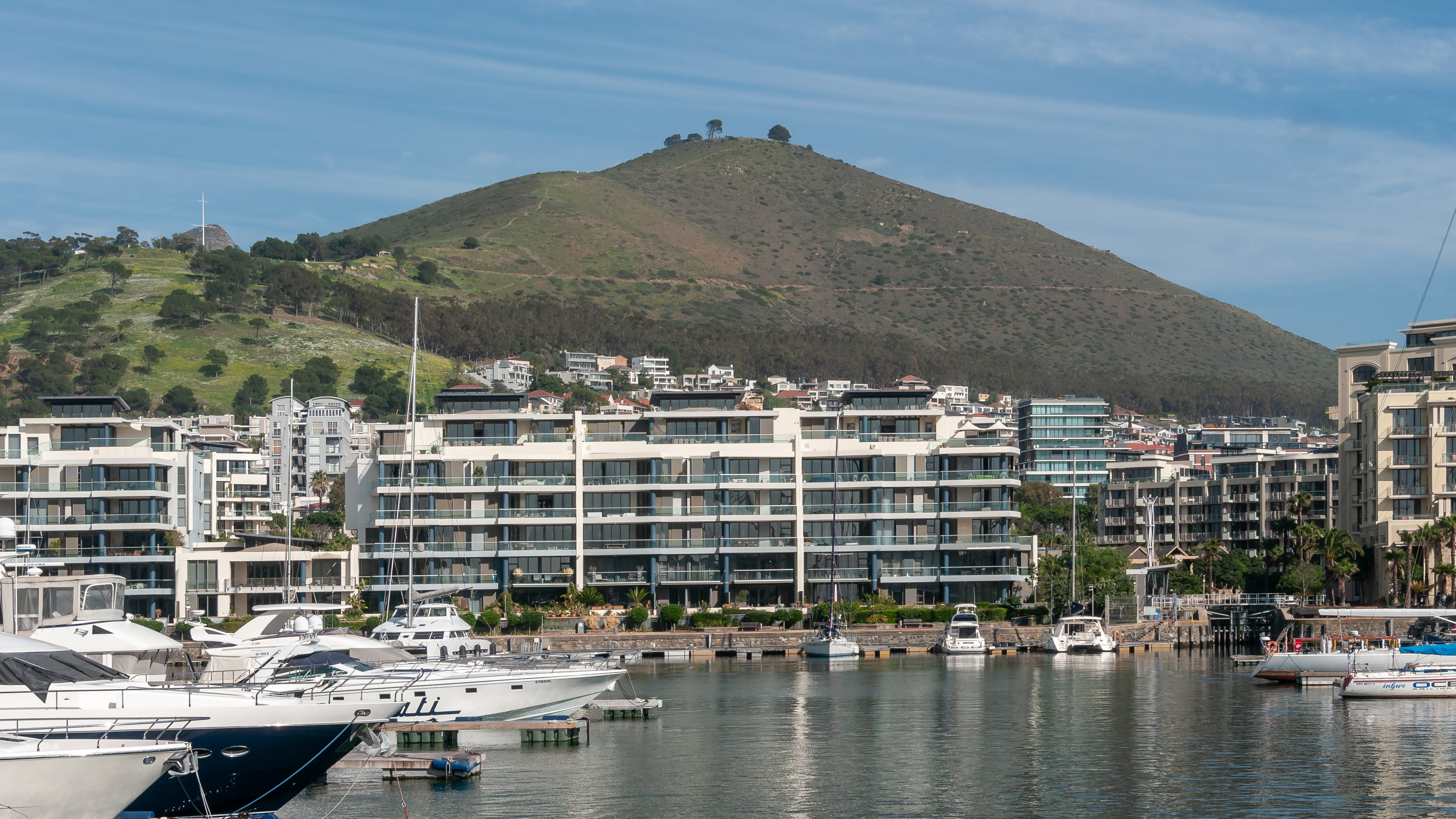
Waterfront apartments in the foreground and Signal Hill in the background

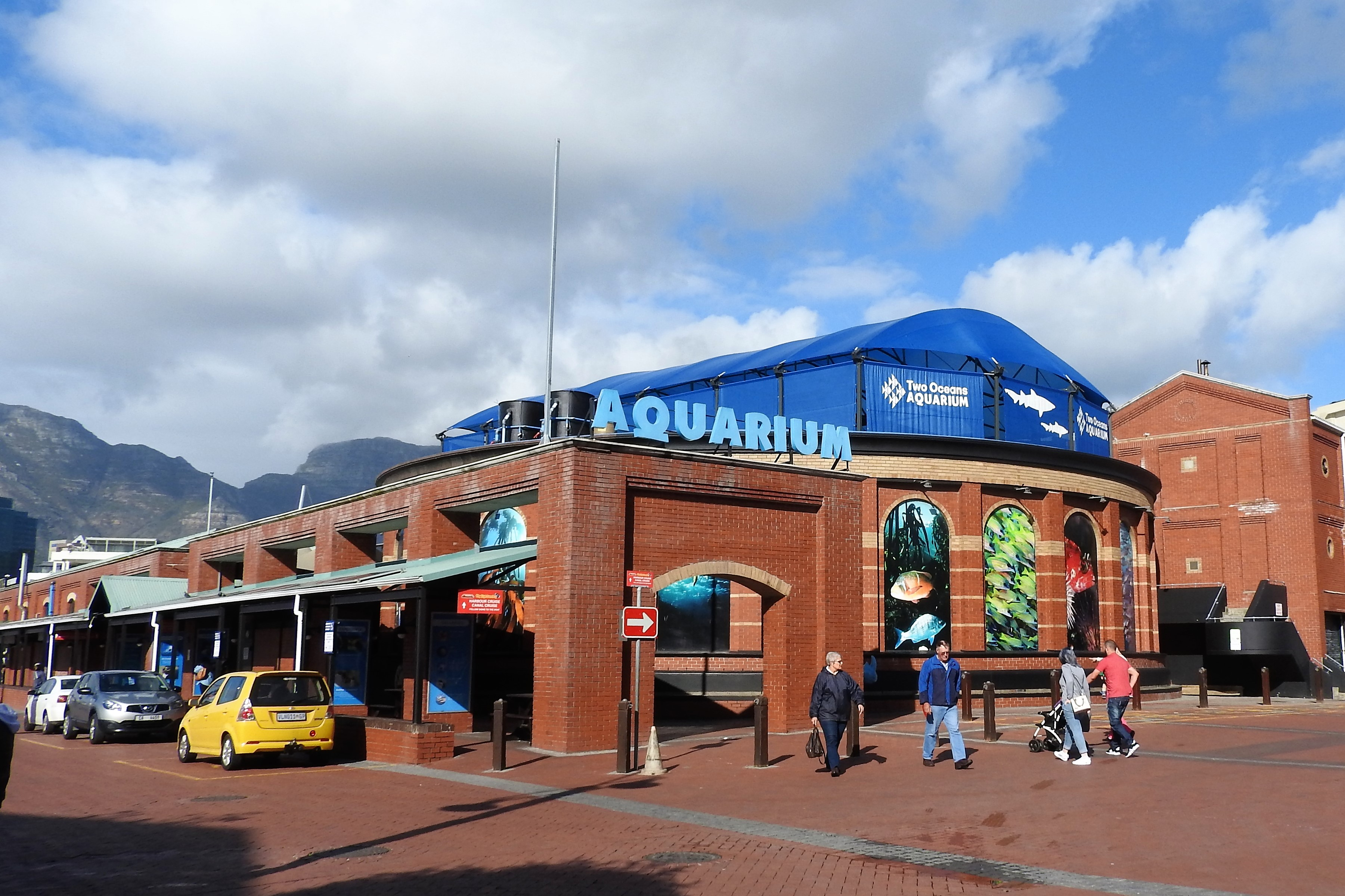
Two Oceans Aquarium

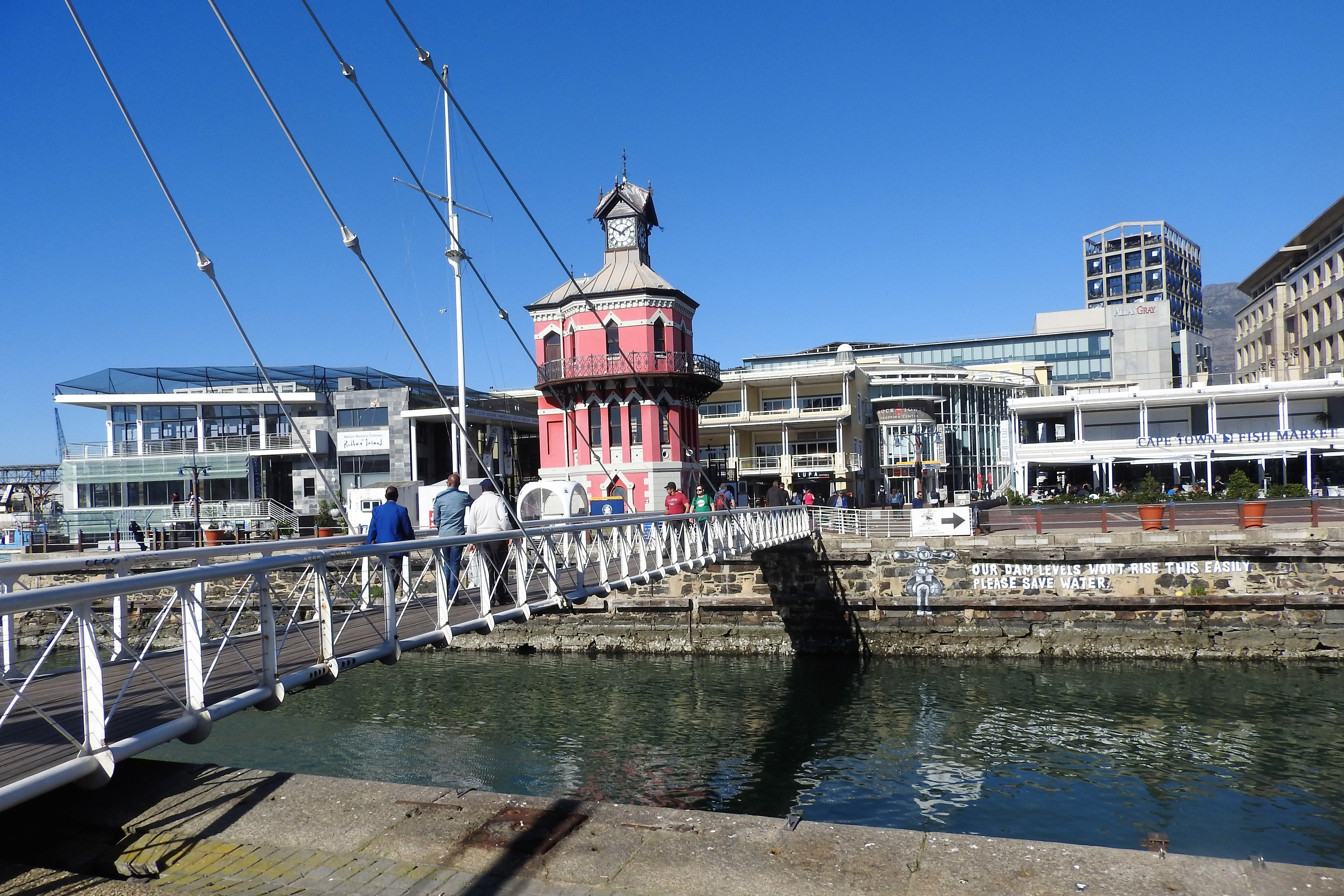
Victoria & Alfred Waterfront Swing Bridge

The V&A Waterfront is a mixed-use property that contains:

- 180 business tenants
- 450+ shops
- 101 entertainment activities
- 80+ eateries
- 13 hotels
- Seven museums
- 22 historical landmarks
- 15 conference venues

Within the Waterfront are offices for Investec, Deloitte, Radisson Hotels, EY, Allan Gray, Pam Golding Property Group, Duracell, British American Tobacco, Red Bull, BP, and Ninety One. The area is also home to Lexus, Toyota, Ferrari, Aston Martin, Audi, and VW dealerships.

The V&A also houses the Cape Business Center for conferences, and Workshop 17 for coworking.

== History ==
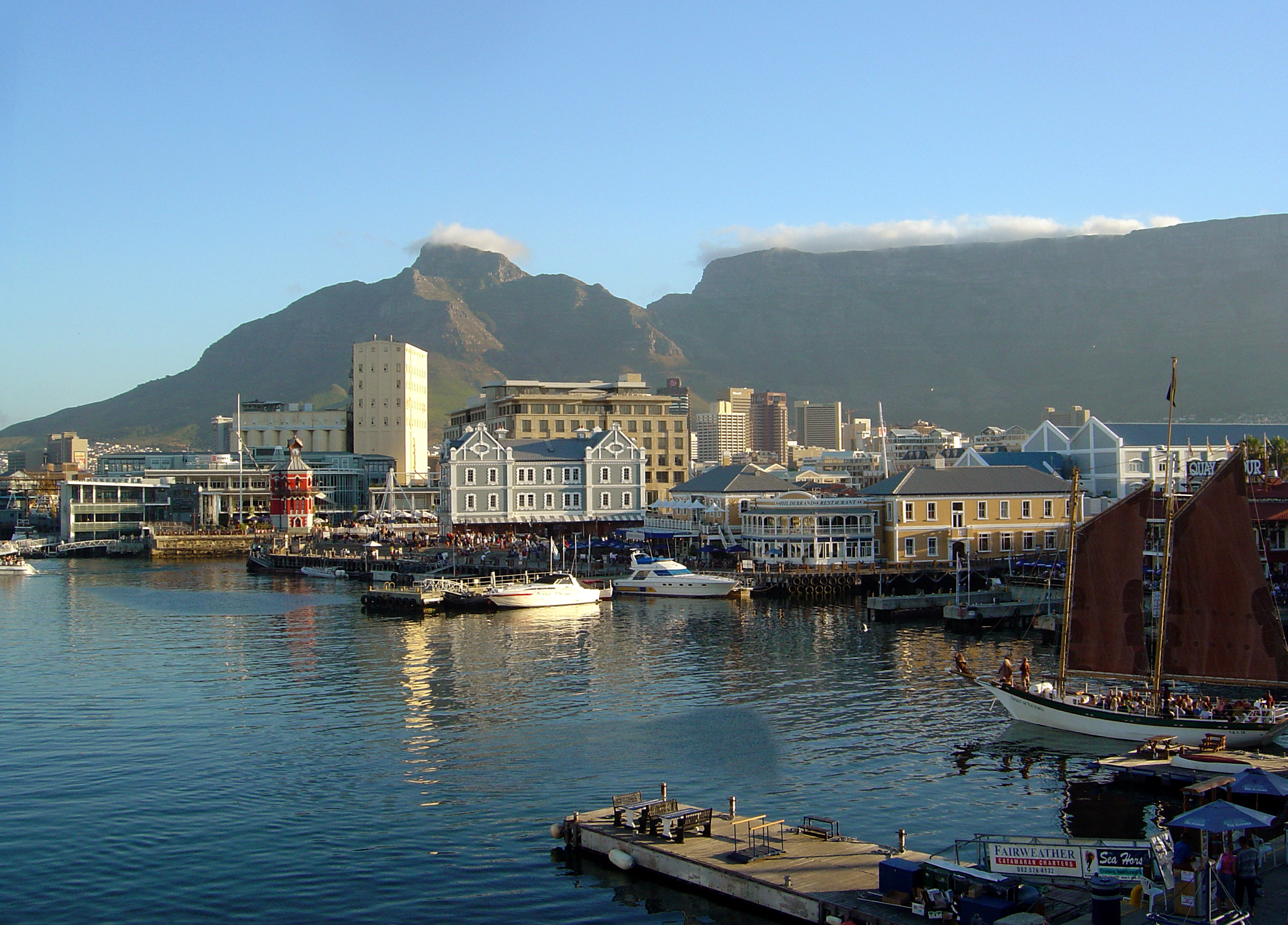
Cape Town waterfront harbour

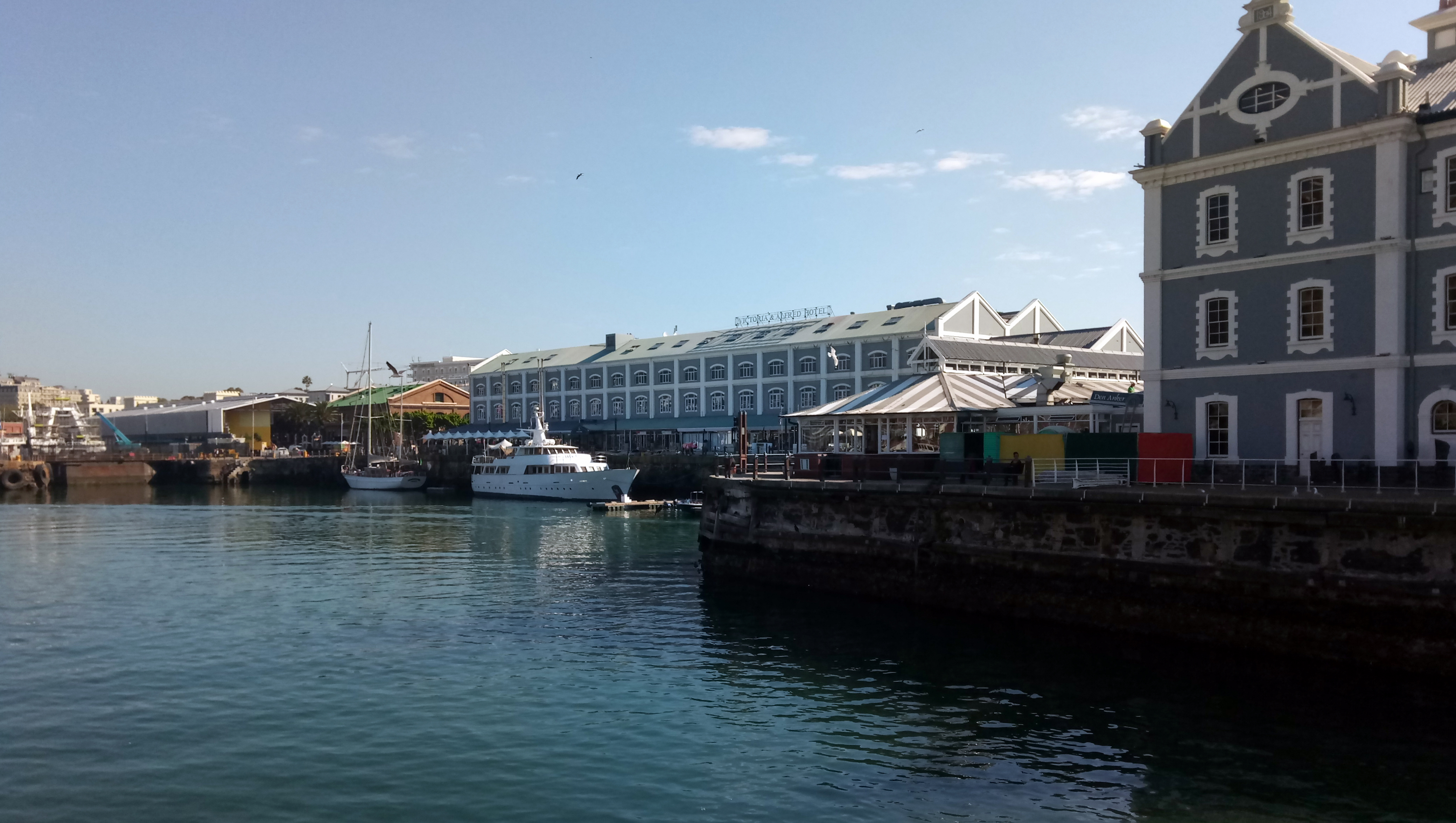
Victoria & Alfred Hotel at Victoria & Alfred Waterfront

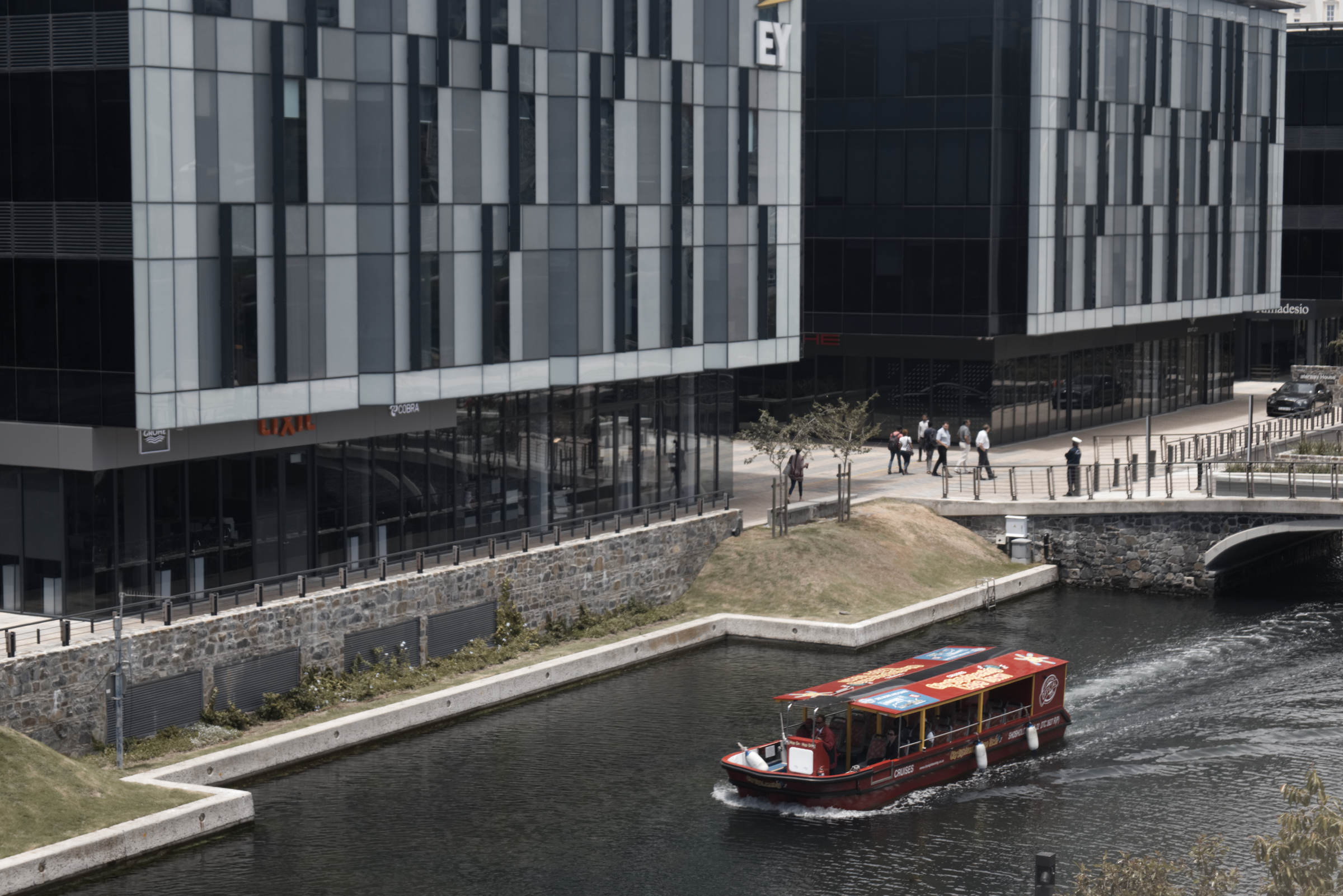
A boat near the Waterway House

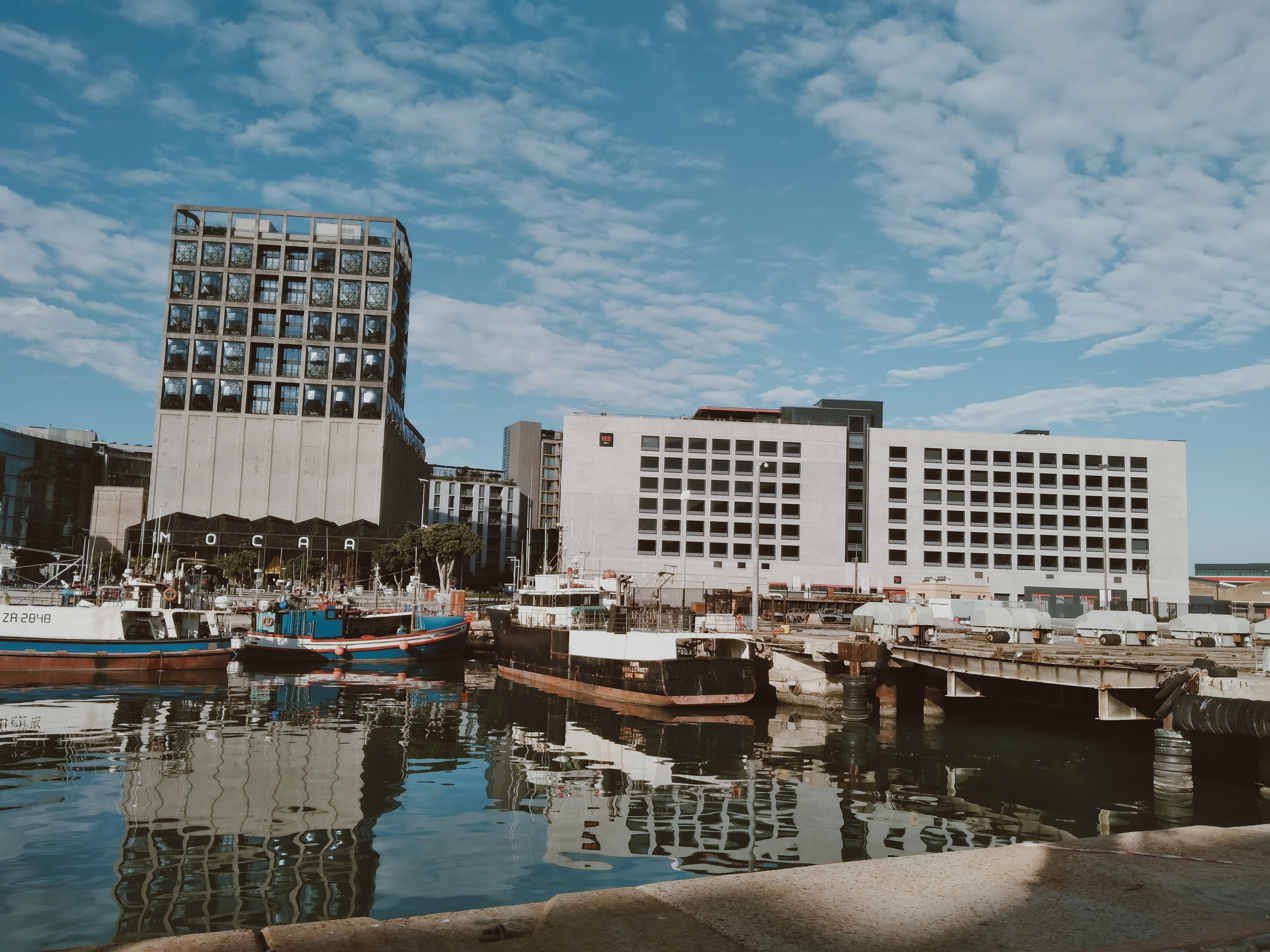
Zeitz Mocaa and Radisson Red Hotel

The V&A Waterfront is a central part of the very beginning of the settlement of the city of Cape Town. In 1654, two years after his arrival in this relatively safe bay at the foot of Table Mountain, Jan van Riebeeck built a small jetty as part of his task to establish a refreshment station at the Cape. Fresh water and fresh produce were provided to the ships of the Dutch East India Company on their arduous and lengthy journey to their outposts in Java and Batavia. The sea and the harbour lie at the heart of Cape Town's history.

In June 1858, serious winter storms, which were a common occurrence, wrecked over 30 vessels. As a consequence, Lloyds of London refused to cover ships spending the winter in Table Bay. On a sunny day in September 17, 1860 Midshipman HRH Prince Alfred, Queen Victoria's second son, tipped the first load of stone to start construction of the breakwater for Cape Town's first harbour to make it a safe haven all year round for passing ships.

In 1984, Sol Kreiner, Mayor of Cape Town, advanced what would become the V&A Waterfront by forming a steering committee to consider a waterfront scheme: "As Johannesburg has gold, we have a beautiful city as a tourist attraction and we must all work together for a better Cape Town. We have a large cross-section of people who are prepared to sit down and discuss a scheme which will bring back the old city where one can freely walk around, visit the harbour, go for tug rides and learn more about our heritage." Kreiner later became the council-nominated director on the board of the Victoria and Alfred Waterfront Company.

== Harbour expansion and reclamation ==
The discovery of gold and diamonds in South Africa meant that the first section of harbour, the Alfred Basin, was not large enough to accommodate the increased number of ships, and the Victoria Basin was built. The construction of these two harbour basins took place between 1860 and 1920, and this area of the harbour still has an array of outstanding heritage buildings from this era.

In 1938 work was started to reclaim land between the city centre and the harbour, most notably the new Duncan Dock. The Foreshore (230 hectares) made city expansion possible. In the early 20th century, South Africa depended mainly on imports for many basic articles in daily use, which explains the importance of the harbour to the people who lived here.

== The Victoria & Alfred Waterfront today ==
In November 1988, Victoria and Alfred Waterfront (Pty) Ltd was established as a wholly owned subsidiary by Transnet Ltd. Its aim was to redevelop the historic docklands around the Victoria and Alfred Basins as a mixed-use area with a focus on retail, tourism and residential development with a working harbour at its centre.

Today it is a mixed-use development that spans 23 hectares, with 24 million visitors a year. Over 23 000 people work and live within its neighbourhood.

== Neighbourhood ==
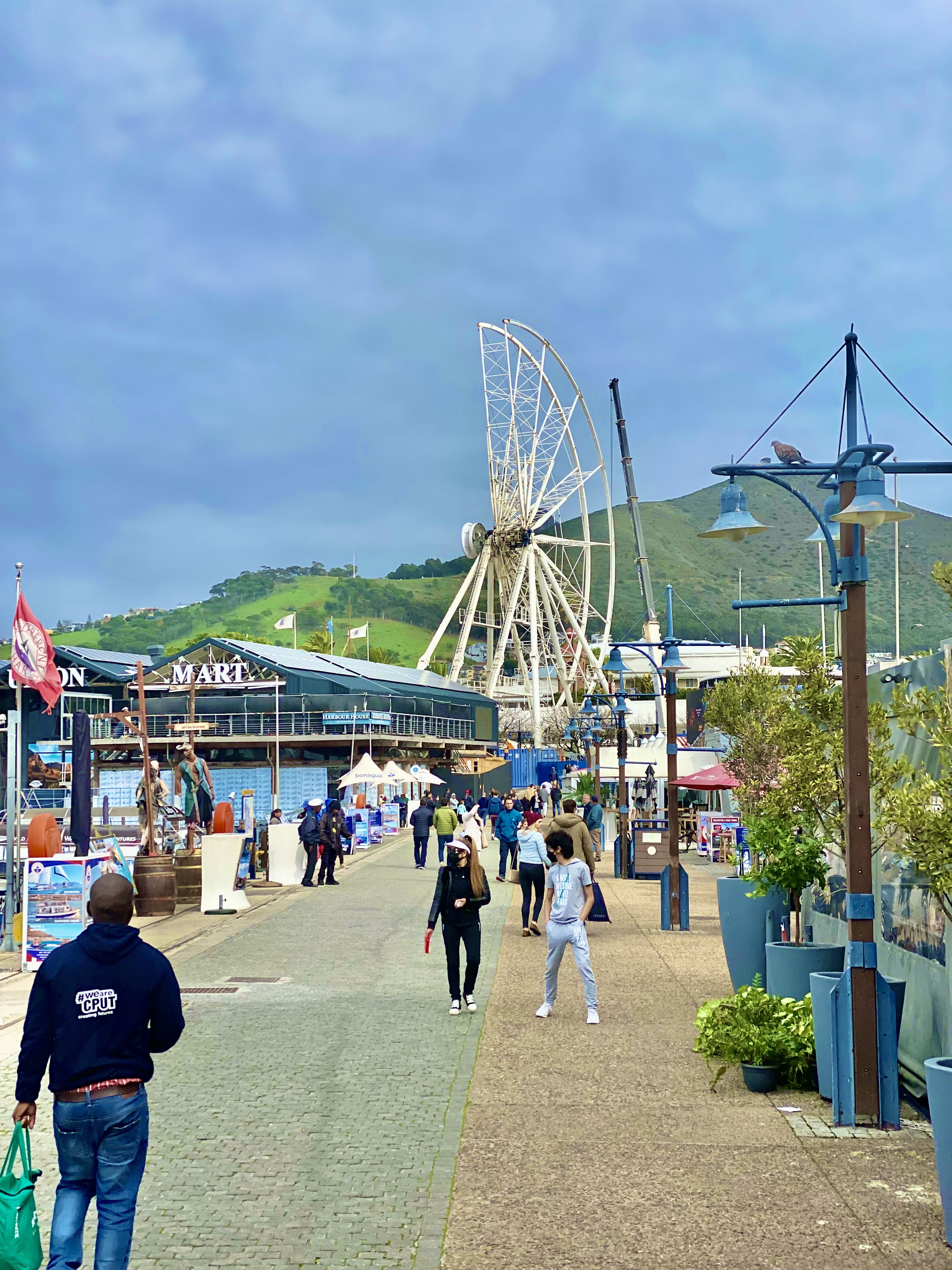
The Cape Wheel in 2022

The V&A Waterfront has several distinct districts.

=== Canal District ===
This urban district connects the V&A waterfront to the City of Cape Town. The area contains Battery Park, and a spa and showroom at Waterway House.

=== Clocktower District ===
This district contains the Port Captain's Office and clock tower, built in 1882, retail facilities, and the Nelson Mandela Gateway, from where the ferries to Robben Island depart. The clock tower has begun to lean slightly to one side, although further leaning has now been halted.

=== Granger Bay District ===
Contains The Lookout events space, The Grand Beach Cafe, the Breakwater residential development, the Oranjezicht City Farm Market, and boardwalks with ocean views.

=== Portswood Ridge District ===
This district connects the V&A waterfront and the Atlantic Seaboard, and includes the UCT Graduate School of Business, a golf course, the corporate offices and Deloitte HQ, and an urban garden.

=== Silo District ===
This district includes the Zeitz Museum of Contemporary Art Africa, the Southern Guild design gallery, restaurants, bars, hotels and office space. It sits next to the Cape Town Cruise Terminal, which also houses Makers Landing.

=== South Arm District ===
This district contains industrial space, and a harbour where fishing industries operate. Commercial vessels also berth at this harbour.

== Developments ==
The V&A Waterfront has seen development in the Silo district, which currently houses the headquarters of Allan Gray Investment Management at Silo 1 and apartments at Silo 2. The project was completed in 2017 with a Virgin Active gym, the Zeitz Museum of Contemporary Art Africa, and the adjoining Silo Hotel.

== Notable attractions at the V&A Waterfront ==
- Breakwater Lodge (University of Cape Town Graduate School of Business)
- Chavonnes Battery
- Nobel Square
- SAS Somerset
- Two Oceans Aquarium
- Zeitz Museum of Contemporary Art Africa
