= Specimens of Bushman Folklore =

1911 book by Wilhelm H. I. Bleek and Lucy C. Lloyd

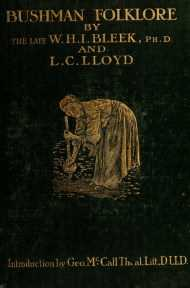
- Author: Wilhelm H. I. Bleek and Lucy C. Lloyd
- Publisher: G. Allen
- Publication date: 1911

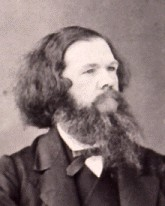
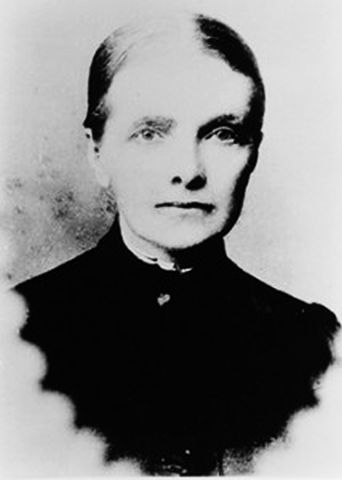
Wilhelm Bleek & Lucy Lloyd, authors

Specimens of Bushman Folklore is a book by the linguist Wilhelm H. I. Bleek and Lucy C. Lloyd, which was published in 1911. The book records eighty-seven legends, myths and other traditional stories of the ǀXam Bushmen in their now-extinct language. The stories were collected through interviews with various narrators, chief among them ǀAǃkunta, ǁKabbo, Diäǃkwain, ǃKweiten-ta-ǁKen and ǀHanǂkasso.

These tales were written down and translated by Bleek and his sister-in-law Lloyd. Bleek died in 1875, but Lloyd continued transcribing ǀXam narratives after his death. It is thanks to her efforts that some of the narratives were eventually published in this book, which also includes sketches of rock art attributed to the Bushmen people and some ǃXun narratives.

Specimens of Bushman Folklore has been considered the cornerstone of study of the Bushmen and their religious beliefs. Laurens van der Post describes the book (and Dorothea Bleek's Mantis and His Friend) as "a sort of Stone Age Bible" in the introduction to The Heart of the Hunter (1961), a follow-up to The Lost World of the Kalahari.

Specimens of Bushman Folklore, as well as the situation of the Bushmen during their disappearance in South Africa and the lives of Bleek and Lloyd, have been covered in a Dutch documentary series called The Broken String.

The Book was considered by Elias Canetti as "the most important book in his possession", and in his Notes from Hampstead he writes about finding in Cesare Pavese diaries that he shared this interest with him.
