= Dorothea Bleek =

German–South African anthropologist (1873–1948)

Dorothy F. Bleek
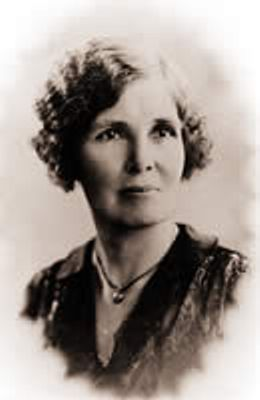
- Born: Dorothea Frances Bleek; 26 March 1873; Mowbray, Cape Colony
- Died: 27 July 1948 (aged 75); Newlands, Union of South Africa
- Citizenship: South Africa; Germany
- Occupations: Anthropologist and philologist
- Father: Wilhelm Bleek

Dorothea Frances Bleek (26 March 1873 – 27 June 1948) was a German–South African anthropologist and philologist known for her research on the Bushmen (the San people) of Southern Africa.

== Career ==
Dorothea Bleek was the fifth daughter of Wilhelm Bleek, a pioneering philologist studying the languages and cultures of Southern Africa in the late 1800s. Much of his work was done in partnership with his sister-in-law (Dorothy Bleek's aunt, Lucy Lloyd). The work of Dorothy Bleek was largely a continuation of her father and aunt's research, but she also made numerous notable contributions of her own to the field. Her culminating work, published after death, was the book A Bushman Dictionary, still referenced today.

Laurens van der Post, who liked to think of himself as "a white Bushman", credited her book Mantis and His Hunter (along with Specimens of Bushman Folklore by her father and aunt) as "a sort of Stone Age Bible". This is in the introduction to The Heart of the Hunter (1961), a follow-up to The Lost World of the Kalahari, the book based on the BBC series that brought the Bushmen to international attention.

Bleek's research and findings are often overshadowed by the work of her father, and she has been criticised for lacking the empathy and intuition of him and her aunt. For example, a section in her 1928 volume on the Naron [Nharo] includes a section on their 'Capacity as workmen', which has contributed to a perception of her as a racist.

Despite this, Bleek's research on the language, customs, and especially rock art of Southern Africa (present-day South Africa, Tanzania, Botswana, and Namibia) stands as a vital contribution to scholarship on the region. Her photographs and audio recordings were especially important to later researchers.

== Bibliography ==
- The Mantis and his friends, 1923
- The Naron, a Bushman tribe of the central Kalahari, 1928
- Comparative vocabularies of Bushman languages, 1929
- Dorothea Bleek, Bushman Dictionary at Google Books; ISBN 9785882327261, 1956
