= Breakwater Lodge =

Building in Cape Town, South Africa

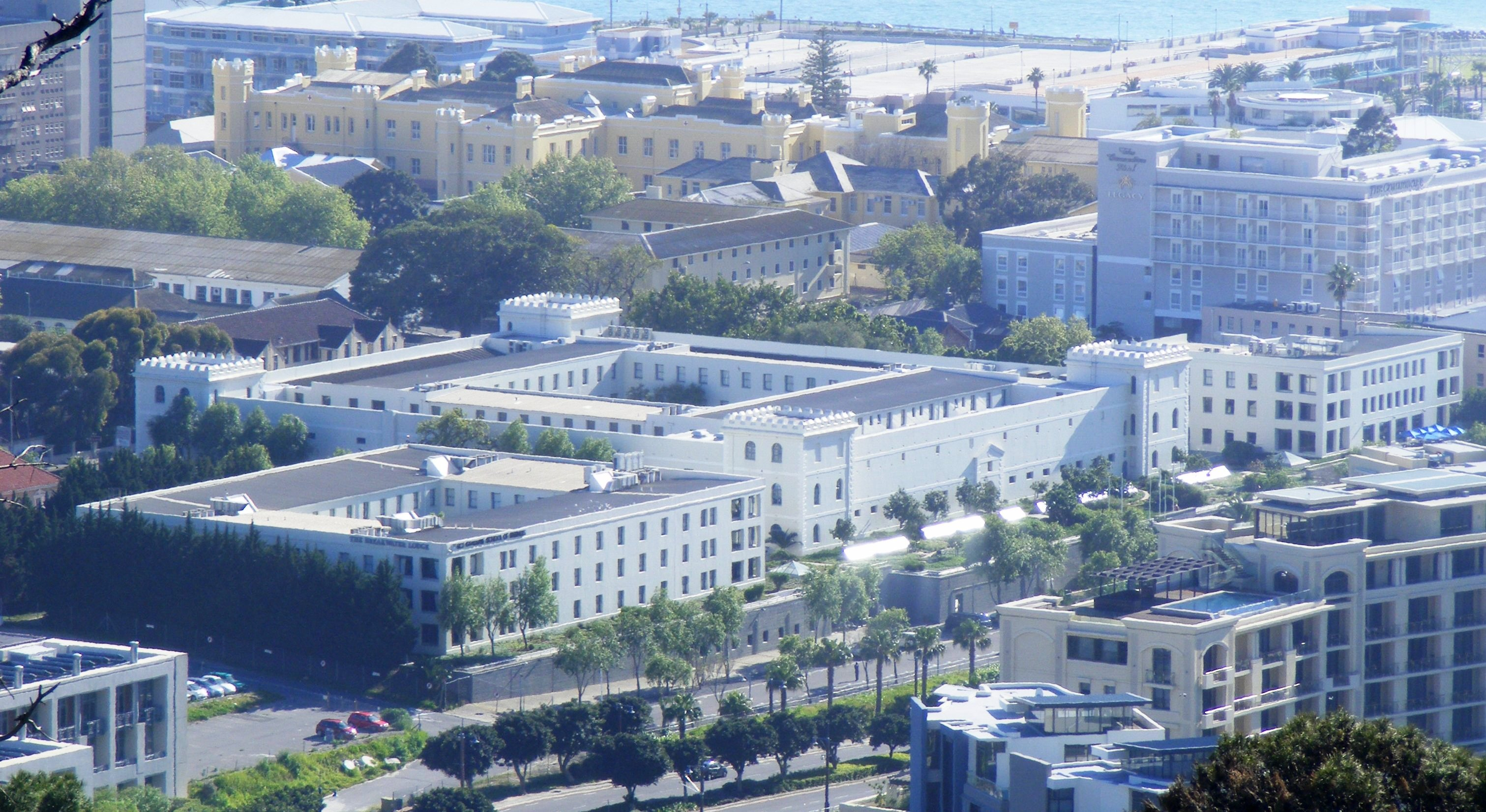
- Breakwater Lodge in 2010. The square turreted building in the centre is the old prison. Taken from Signal Hill

- Location within Cape Town
- 33°54′24″S 18°24′58″E

History
- Built: 1901

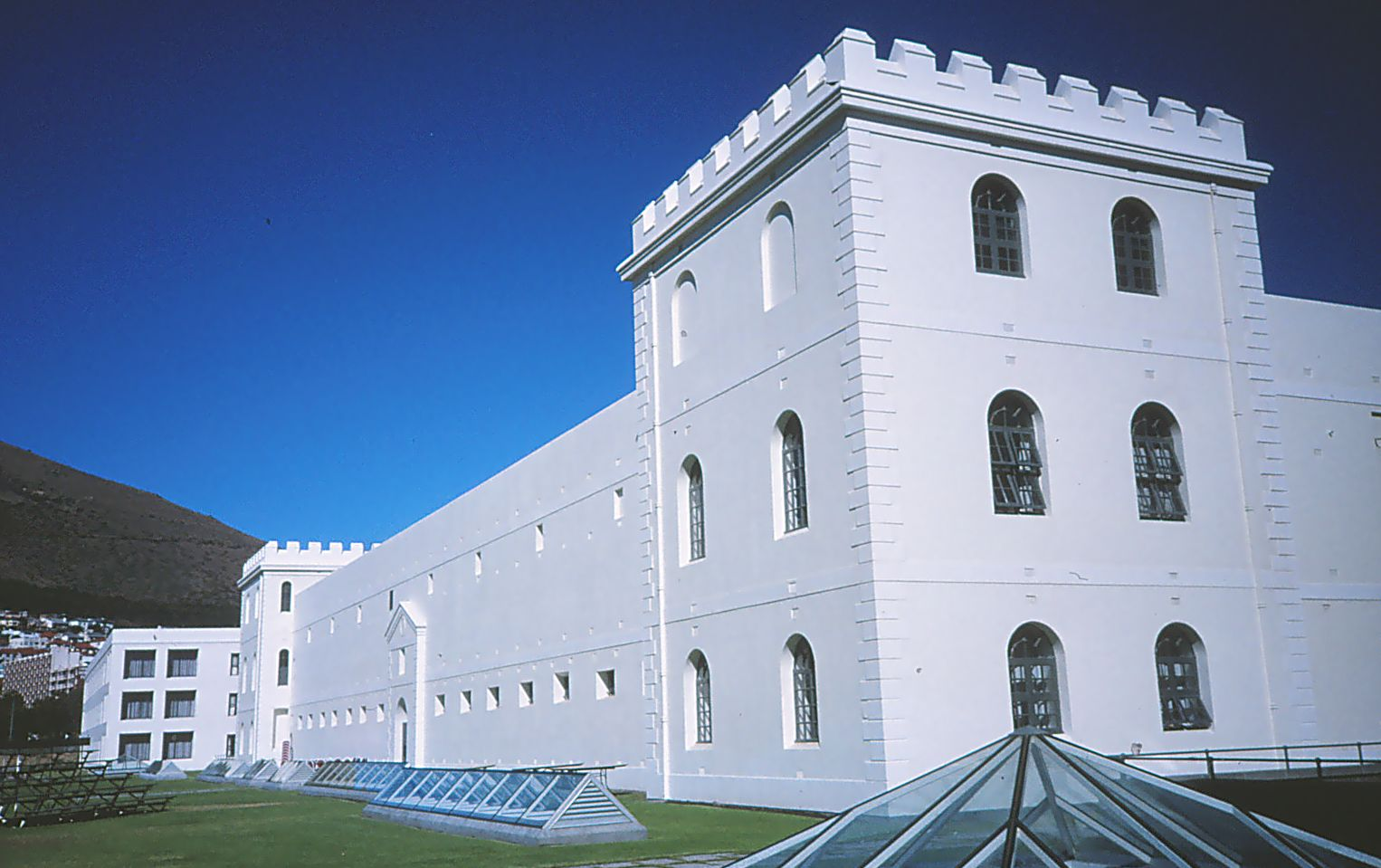
The Breakwater Lodge, February 1997.

The Breakwater Lodge in the Victoria & Alfred Waterfront, Cape Town, South Africa was built as a prison in 1859. It is now part of the University of Cape Town and a hotel.

The original prison was built in 1859 for convicts from Britain at the suggestion of John Montagu who was the colonial secretary to the Cape of Good Hope from 1843 to 1852. They were transported to The Cape to work on the construction of the breakwater which would allow the harbour which is now the Victoria & Alfred Waterfront to be built. The remains of a treadmill on which prisoners were punished can still be seen.

During the later part of the 19th century other prisoners were accommodated at Breakwater prison and it was the first site to racially segregate black and white convicts.

In 1902 white prisoners were moved into a new building, called the Industrial Breakwater Prison, which remains today. The design with four castellated turrets and an enclosed courtyard was styled after Millbank and Pentonville prisons in England. After ten years as a prison it became a juvenile offenders institution and from 1926 until 1989 a hostel for black dock workers.

Since 1991 it has served as the Graduate School of Business of University of Cape Town and hotel run by the Protea chain.
