= ǁKabbo =

Chronicler of ǀXam culture and knowledge

ǁKábbo
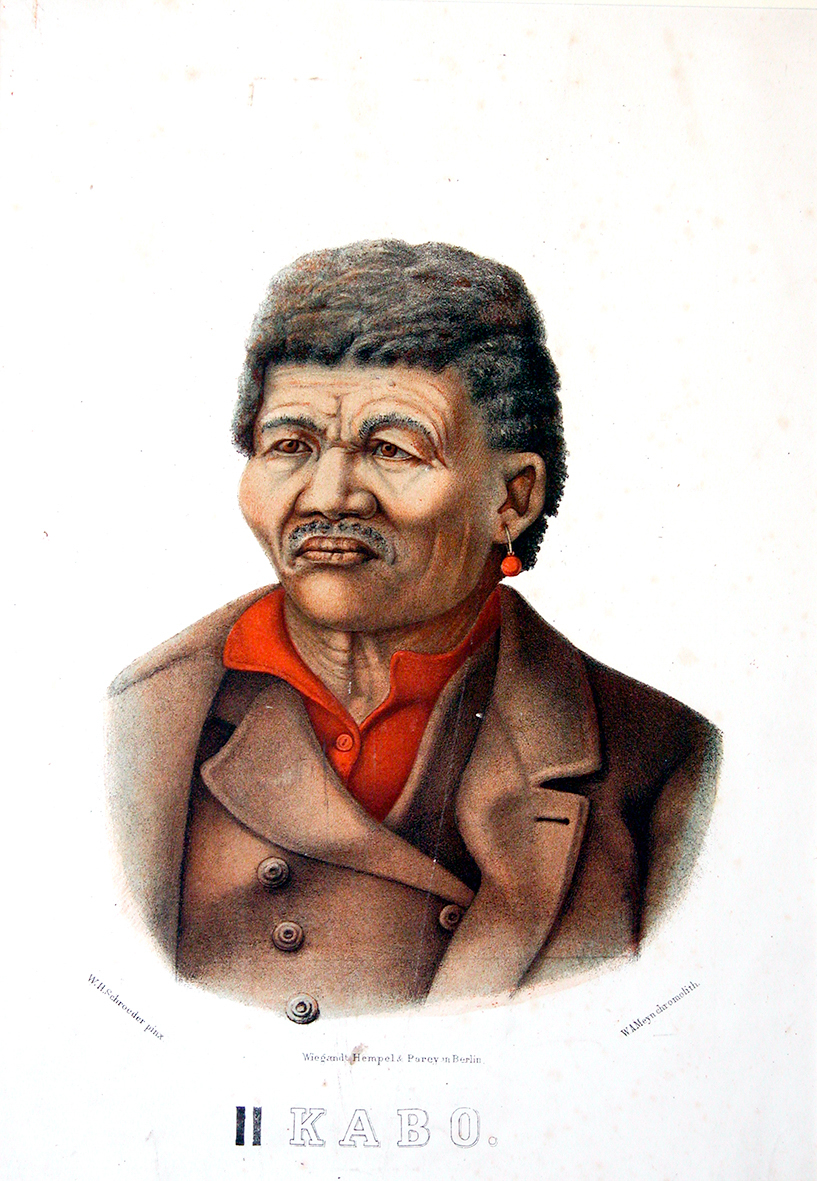
- Portrait of ǁKábbo commissioned by Wilhelm Bleek in 1873, then printed in Berlin, used as the frontispiece to Specimens of Bushman Folklore, London, George Allen & Co.
- Born: c. 1815; The Bitterpits near today's Kenhardt
- Died: 25 January 1876 (aged 60–61); Vanwyksvlei, Cape Colony
- Other names: ǀUhi-ddoro, Jantje Tooren or Touren
- Occupations: Hunter; San rainmaker; ǀXam storyteller; instructor of Bleek and Lloyd
- Notable work: Contributed to the Specimens of Bushman Folklore published by Wilhelm Bleek and Lucy Lloyd
- Spouse: ǃKwabba-an (or Oud Lies)
- Relatives: ǀHaṅǂkassʼō, son-in-law

ǁKábbo (pronounced approximately [ǁ͡kábo]; (Note: Bleek & Lloyd wrote a k after a click letter when the posterior release of the click was audible. Based on the sounds attested in the closely related language Nǁng, ⟨ǁk⟩ may therefore represent a lateral pulmonic-contour click, though this is not certain.) /ˈkæboʊ/ KAB-oh; c. 1815 – 25 January 1876) (with additional names ǀŬhī-ddor̄ŏ and Jantje Tooren) was a storyteller and chronicler of ǀXam culture and knowledge. He was a member of the ǀXam people, a San people of South Africa. From 1871 to 1873, he lived with Wilhelm Bleek and Lucy Lloyd and played an important role in contributing to the Bleek and Lloyd collection. Many of his stories were published in Specimens of Bushman Folklore; they provide rich information on the life, rituals, and beliefs of ǀXam society.

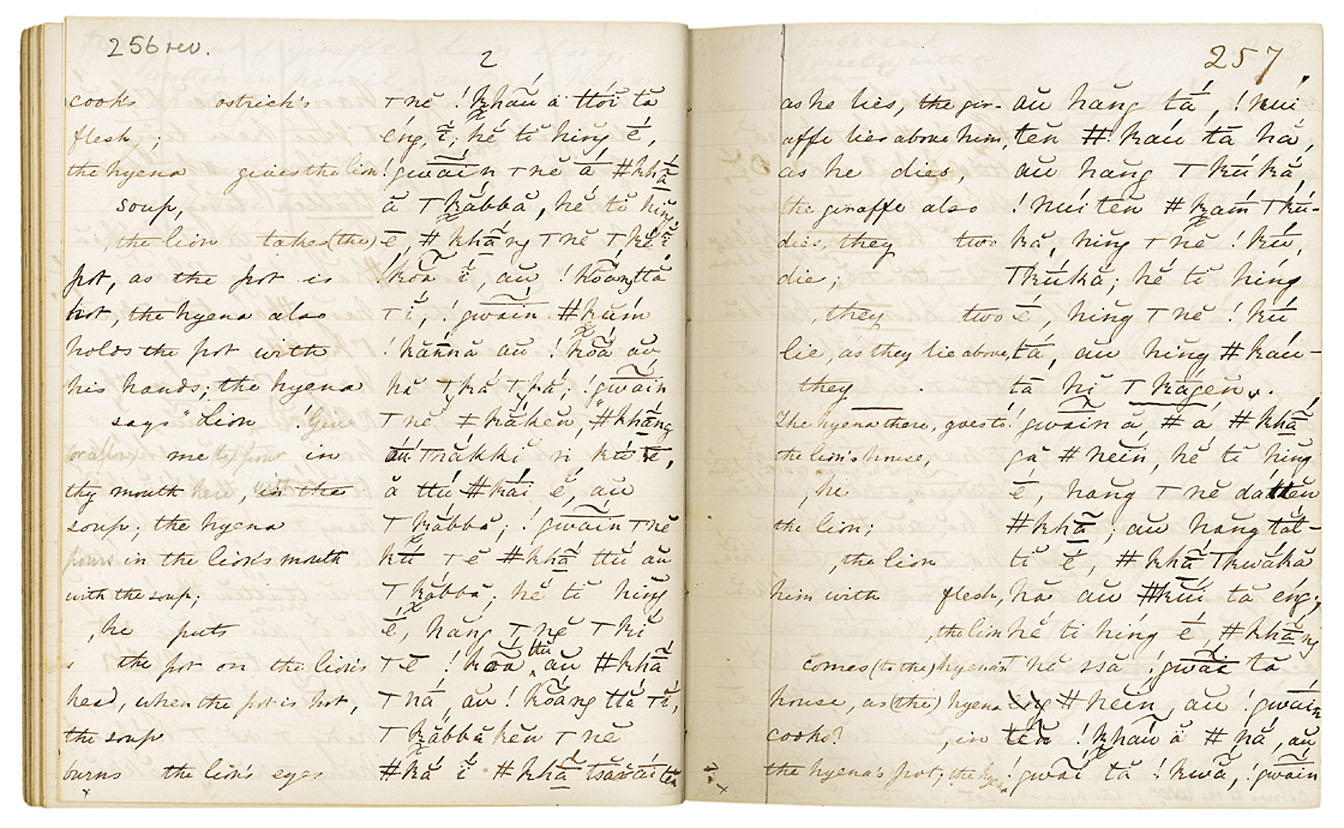
Story: Lion and giraffe, Lucy Lloyd

== Youth and early adult life ==
ǁKábbo belonged to a ǀXam clan called the Ssʼwa ka ǃKui (Plains People). He was born around 1815 in an area referred to as The Bitterpits, located some 50 km South of today's small town of Kenhardt. At the time, the area was outside of the borders of the Cape Colony. The name ǁKábbo means 'dream', but was given to him only as a young man. His childhood name was ǀHanǂiǂI, meaning 'husband's thoughts'. During his childhood, he experienced a time of great drought, in which his father and other family members died. His mother ǃKwí-ăṅ́ died when he was a teenager. In the early 1840s, he married ǃKu̥ábba-aṅ́, with whom he had three children, one of whom died in infancy. He has shared extensive accounts of the landscape and the places (waterholes, rocky formations etc.) which he says to have owned, having inherited them from his father; most of these places are associated with hunting of animals such as ostriches or springboks.

== Relationship with European settlers (1840s to 1860s) ==
From ǁKábbo's accounts, we can gain insights into the interactions of Europeans with ǀXam people in the area over these critical decades of the 19th century. Already in the 1840s, ǁKábbo saw many younger members of his extended family "being taken", i.e. being coerced to go and work for the Boers. In the 1850s, after Governor Sir Harry Smith extended the boundary of the Cape Colony from the Sak River up to the Orange River, ǁKábbo apparently witnessed part of his extended family being massacred by a Boer commando. His accounts about later episodes of his life include many happy episodes of hunting with his daughter's husband ǀHaṅǂkassʼō in the 1860s. This is the period of the ostrich feathers' boom at the Cape, and there is evidence that the ǀXam became involved in some barter with white farmers, whereby they would exchange ostrich feathers for tobacco or other goods. In the late 1860s, another period of drought set in, worsened for the ǀXam by the white settlers' control of the land for their cattle. Around 1868, ǁKábbo is said to have become the leader of a notorious gang of cattle thieves, which according to Tony Traill had stolen 19 head of cattle around May–June 1868, and further 10 head of cattle in the winter of 1868.

== Arrest, trial and prison sentence ==
Following the Northern Border Protection Act, passed by the Cape Parliament in August 1868, the government sent troops to restore order; in March 1869 they arrested hundreds of Korana pastoralists, who were known to raid settler farms, and in a mop-up operation arrested a dozen ǀXam individuals for theft of livestock, among them ǁKábbo, his son and his son-in-law. ǁKábbo reported that after their arrest, the three men were transported to Victoria West by wagon (with their wives and children following on foot). In Victoria West, they were tried and convicted to two years of hard labour on 23 October 1869. At first they were made to work towards the construction of a road in Victoria West, but later they were transferred to a jail without a roof in Beaufort West, before being taken by foot to Wellington where they were transported to Cape Town. On 1 March 1870, they were entered in the register of prisoners of Cape Town's Breakwater Convict Station and were subsequently made to work at the docks. This is where he met linguist Dr Wilhelm Bleek and his sister-in-law Lucy Lloyd, in November 1870. In January 1871, Bleek subjected ǁKábbo to the humiliating experience of being photographed naked, in accordance with the specifications provided by Thomas Huxley, to contribute to Huxley's empire-wide project of gathering photographic specimens for anthropological purposes.

== Storytelling at The Hill, Mowbray (1871-1873) ==
After learning the basics of ǀXam language from their first young informant ǀAǃkuṅta, Bleek and Lloyd were keen to host a new informant that would be able to share more about ǀXam stories and mythology. ǁKábbo was a more experienced man who had accumulated considerable practical knowledge and was also a passionate storyteller. ǁKábbo was transferred from the Breakwater Convict House to The Hill, the Bleeks' house in Mowbray in February 1871 and became Bleek and Lloyd's second ǀXam instructor. In daytime and evening sessions, Bleek and Lloyd recorded elements of ǁKábbo's genealogy, a map of the place where he came from, and rich stories retracing both ǀXam mythology (e.g. "Mantis and Moon"), old legends and family stories, as well as scenes from everyday life of the ǀXam, such as practices associated with hunting of ostriches or springboks. ǁKábbo's stories were often told over many days, and he used digressions, dialogues and body language to enliven and possibly to stretch the narrative. Although ǁKábbo's prison sentence had ended by mid-1871, he stayed at The Hill until 1873, but was feeling increasingly nostalgic and homesick. He also expressed frustration at having to work as a servant to Bleek's wife Jemima and her sisters, a relationship that was at odds with the sense of dignity and respect which he felt was due to older men.

== Returning home ==
ǁKábbo and ǀAǃkuṅta left Mowbray on 15 October 1873 by foot to return to their families. ǁKábbo was able to find his wife ǃKu̥ábba-aṅ́. However, the place of his great-grandfather had been taken over by settlers and he and his wife were forced to live on a farm 50 km south of his home, where ǁKábbo died on 26 January 1876.

== Works ==
- Lewis-Williams, J.D, ed. (2000). Stories That Float From Afar. Cape Town: David Philip. ISBN 0-86486-462-0.
- Bleek, Wilhelm H. I.; Lloyd, Lucy C. (1911). Specimens of Bushman Folklore. G. Allen.

== See also ==
- Wilhelm Bleek
- Lucy Lloyd
- ǃKweiten-ta-ǁKen
- Specimens of Bushman Folklore
