= Lucy Lloyd =

British folklorist (1834–1914)

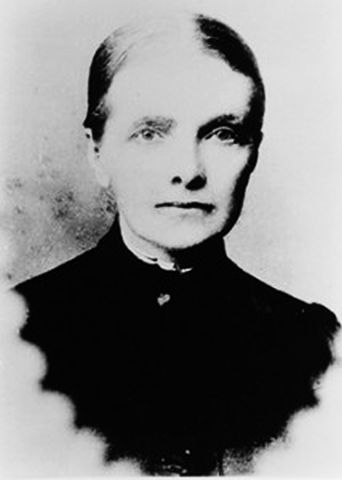
- Lloyd, c. 1880
- Born: Lucy Catherine Lloyd; 7 November 1834; Norbury, England
- Died: 31 August 1914 (aged 79); Mowbray, Union of South Africa
- Resting place: Wynberg, Cape Town
- Scientific career
- Fields: linguist, folklore

Lucy Catherine Lloyd (7 November 1834 – 31 August 1914) was a British folklorist and linguist. With the German philologist Wilhelm Bleek, she created a 19th-century archive of ǀXam and !Kung texts.

== Early life ==
Lucy Catherine Lloyd was born to a Welsh family in Norbury in England on 7 November 1834. Her father, William Lloyd, was the rector of Norbury and vicar of Ranton, two villages in western England in Staffordshire. He was also chaplain to the Earl of Lichfield, to whom he was related through his mother. Lucy Lloyd's mother was Lucy Anne Jeffreys, also a minister's daughter, who died in 1842 when Lucy was eight. Lucy Lloyd was the second of four daughters. Her father remarried in 1844 and had 13 additional children with his new wife. After her mother's death, Lucy and her sisters lived with their maternal uncle and his wife, Sir John and Caroline Dundas, from whom they received a private and apparently liberal education.

In 1847 Robert Gray was consecrated Bishop of Cape Town. William Lloyd was sent to Durban along with his family in April 1849, when Lucy was 14, as colonial and military chaplain to the Colony of Natal's British forces. In 1852 Gray established the Diocese of Natal with John William Colenso as its first bishop. Colenso established his residence at Bishopstowe, near Pietermaritzburg and a party of 45 accompanied him, including the young Wilhelm Bleek who was to assist Colenso as anthropologist and philologist. William Lloyd later became archdeacon of Durban.

The Lloyd family had limited financial means in Durban even though the four older girls had inherited some money from their mother. Lucy and her sisters are said to have had liberal and unorthodox views and Lucy had trained as a teacher. Lucy and Jemima (who was to marry Wilhelm Bleek) were very close, and both were repulsed by their father whom they thought to be a hypocrite. After Lucy had refused to allow him to spend her inheritance he threw her out of their home and she went to stay on a farm owned by people called the Middletons. In 1858 Lucy became engaged to the sweet and widely travelled man George Woolley, the son of a minister. According to Lucy's sister Jemima the Middletons were wretched people who sowed distrust and pain between the couple. Lucy broke off the engagement, but she regretted this all her life, blaming herself for George's early miserable death. In a letter she wrote much later to her niece, Helma, on the occasion of the latter's engagement she said: 'May yours (with your dear Mother beside you), have a very different ending. I missed my dear Mother so sorely then, and the loving counsel and advice, which she could have given me. I had only my own theories and inexperience to go upon.'

== Collaboration with Wilhelm Bleek ==
Lucy's sister, Jemima, married Wilhelm Bleek on 22 November 1862 and they had seven children, five of whom survived to adulthood. In the same year as his marriage, Bleek was appointed curator of the Grey Collection at the South African Library in Cape Town.

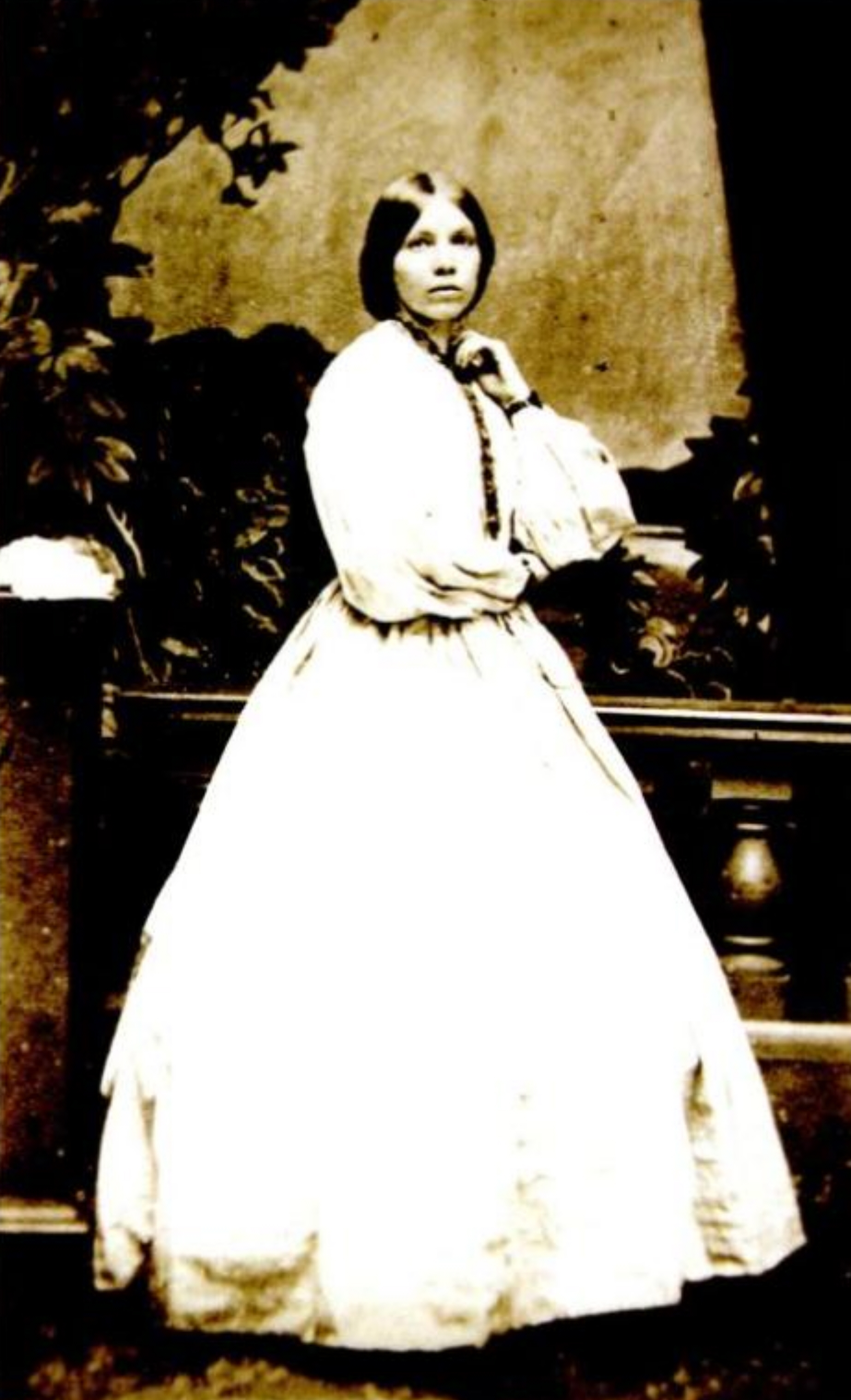
Lucy Lloyd (ca 1862)

Lucy travelled to Cape Town from Durban aboard the Natal mail steamer, the SS Waldensian, in October 1862, for the wedding of her sister. The ship ran aground on a reef near Cape Agulhas and, although the passengers and crew were rescued, Lucy lost most of her possessions and wedding gifts, managing to retrieve only a pair of vases for her sister (which she carried on her lap in the lifeboat) and a set of Sir Walter Scott's novels that had washed ashore in good condition as they were wrapped in waterproof packaging.

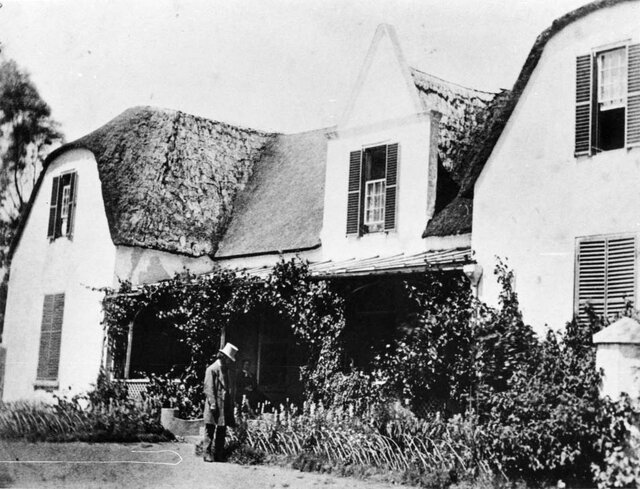
The Hill in Mowbray in the early 1870s when the Bleeks lived there and where many of the ǀXam informants' interviews occurred

Lucy settled with her sister and Wilhelm some years after their marriage. After living at first in New Street, the Bleek family moved to The Hill in Mowbray. Lucy and Wilhelm started their work with oral histories on the arrival of the first Xam (Cape Bushman) speaker at Mowbray in 1870, |A!kunta. Gradually, she acquired full mastery of the |Xam language and was even better able than Bleek to record and transcribe texts provided by their informants, especially ǁKabbo, ≠Kasin and Dia!kwain. She recorded their stories with great attention to detail, including body language. Overall, she recorded two-thirds of the texts recorded until Bleek's death and took over the responsibility of the publication of their second report to the Cape Parliament in 1875.

== Leading further research on San language and folklore ==
After Bleek's death in August 1875, and true to the desire expressed in a codicil to his will written in 1871, Lucy continued working on their joint Bushman studies, taking the leading role in interviewing informants, specifically Dia!kwain and |Han≠kass'o, recording and transcribing their stories, sourcing materials, as well as publishing articles in magazines such as the Cape Monthly Magazine. While Lucy would undoubtedly have done this anyway, his request must surely have bestowed on her work the credibility that, in those days, was usually reserved for male scholars and researchers. For some interviews, especially those of young !Kung boys, she received the support of her sister, Bleek's widow, Jemima.

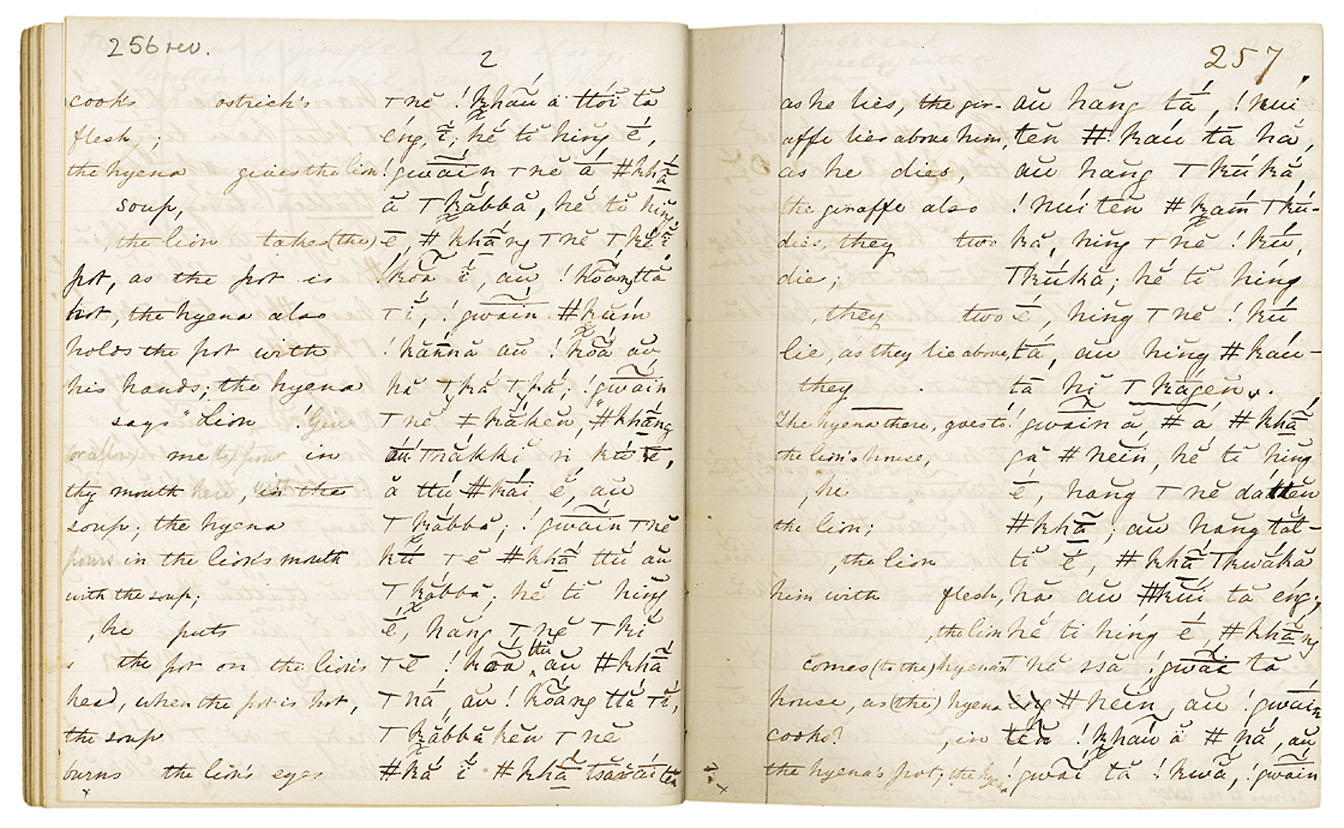
Lucy Lloyd notebooks: Story: Lion and giraffe; Contributors ǁKabbo (Jantje)

Fanny and Julia Lloyd joined the Bleek and Lloyd household (now at Charlton House, also in Mowbray). Lucy was appointed curator of the Grey Collection as successor to Bleek after his death in 1875, at half his salary, a position she accepted reluctantly. During this time she worked with the Grey Collection and at editing various manuscripts collected by Bleek, as well as continuing with her |Xam research in her own time. She began corresponding with George W. Stow in 1875 about his copies of Bushman art, and in 1876 he proposed a book that would eventually be published (with Lucy's support) in an incomplete form as The Native Races of Southern Africa. Lucy also played an important role in the founding of the SA Folklore Society, for which she acted as secretary for a while, and in the founding of the Folklore Journal in 1879.

Lucy's services at the South African Library were terminated in 1880 when Dr Johannes Theophilus Hahn was appointed, after a long and painful saga, in her place. Her relationship with the library had been fraught, and particularly with the Cape Colony's Secretary-General for Education Langham Dale who made the new appointment. She thought Hahn to be a fool and his appointment a disaster. Lloyd and the trustees of the Grey Collection, who supported her, took the case to the Supreme Court for judgment. The appointment, however, went ahead. Hahn resigned two years later, after which no custodian of the collection was appointed.

After Stow's death in 1882, Lloyd purchased his tracings and copies of Bushman paintings as well as the manuscript of Native Races from his wife, Fanny Stow. Lucy then engaged the services of the historian George McCall Theal to work with her on the manuscript and edit it. It was published in London in 1905 along with some photographic images taken from Lucy's own collection.

== Return to Europe ==
Lucy Lloyd and her sister Fanny went to England for a time in 1883, for financial and health-related reasons. Lucy's letters show her to have been ill at the time. Indeed, she described herself as having endured 'years of overwork and many of ill-health'. After the loss of her position at the South African Library, the family had found themselves in a precarious financial position with too many mouths to feed – at times, whole families, numbers of adults as well as children, often in poor health, lived in their home – and Lucy's last recorded work with the Bushmen appears to have been in 1884. All in all, at least 17 people had lived in the Mowbray household between 1870 and 1884, some for extended periods. Expenses included food, clothing and tobacco (according to Bleek's list of expenses for 1871 he also budgeted for the arrival of the informants' wives). After Bleek's death in 1875, followed by the loss of Lloyd's job, Jemima Bleek and Lucy Lloyd were responsible for the upkeep of their various guests and their families, as well as their own sisters and young children.

As a result of these financial constraints, Jemima Bleek moved her family to Germany in 1884 to stay with relatives and receive schooling there, and it appears that the other Lloyd sisters joined them. Lucy Lloyd is believed to have gone to Europe in 1887. For years, she tried to find a European publisher who could be enticed to publish the collected Bushman stories; but publishers seemed reluctant to commit to the high cost of printing the |Xam text, as they did not expect to attract a sufficient number of readers to cover those costs. Finally, in 1889, she had her Short Account of Further Bushman Material Collected published in London. Around that period, Lucy Lloyd trained her niece Dorothea in Bushman research – and she moved between Germany, Switzerland, England and Wales, with occasional trips to the Cape around 1905 and 1907. She returned permanently to South Africa in 1912. The Bleek family remained in Germany for the following 21 years.

== Contributions and awards ==
Lucy Lloyd submitted a third report to the Cape Government concerning 'Bushman Researches', dated London 8 May 1889, in which she added 4,534 half-pages or columns to the collection. In 1911 a selection of texts from Bleek and Lloyd's extraordinary project – and a considerable achievement given Lloyd's personal circumstances at the time – was edited by her and published as Specimens of Bushman Folklore.

In 1913 Lloyd received an honorary doctorate from the University of the Cape of Good Hope in recognition of her contribution to research. In the words of the time, the citation read:

…an original production worthy of the highest praise. It is not only a masterly exposition of the folklore of a vanishing race that has remained primitive, but the philological value of the work is greater still, and the work will remain an authority on the language of the "Bushman and kindred races.

She was the first woman to receive this degree in South Africa.

== Death ==
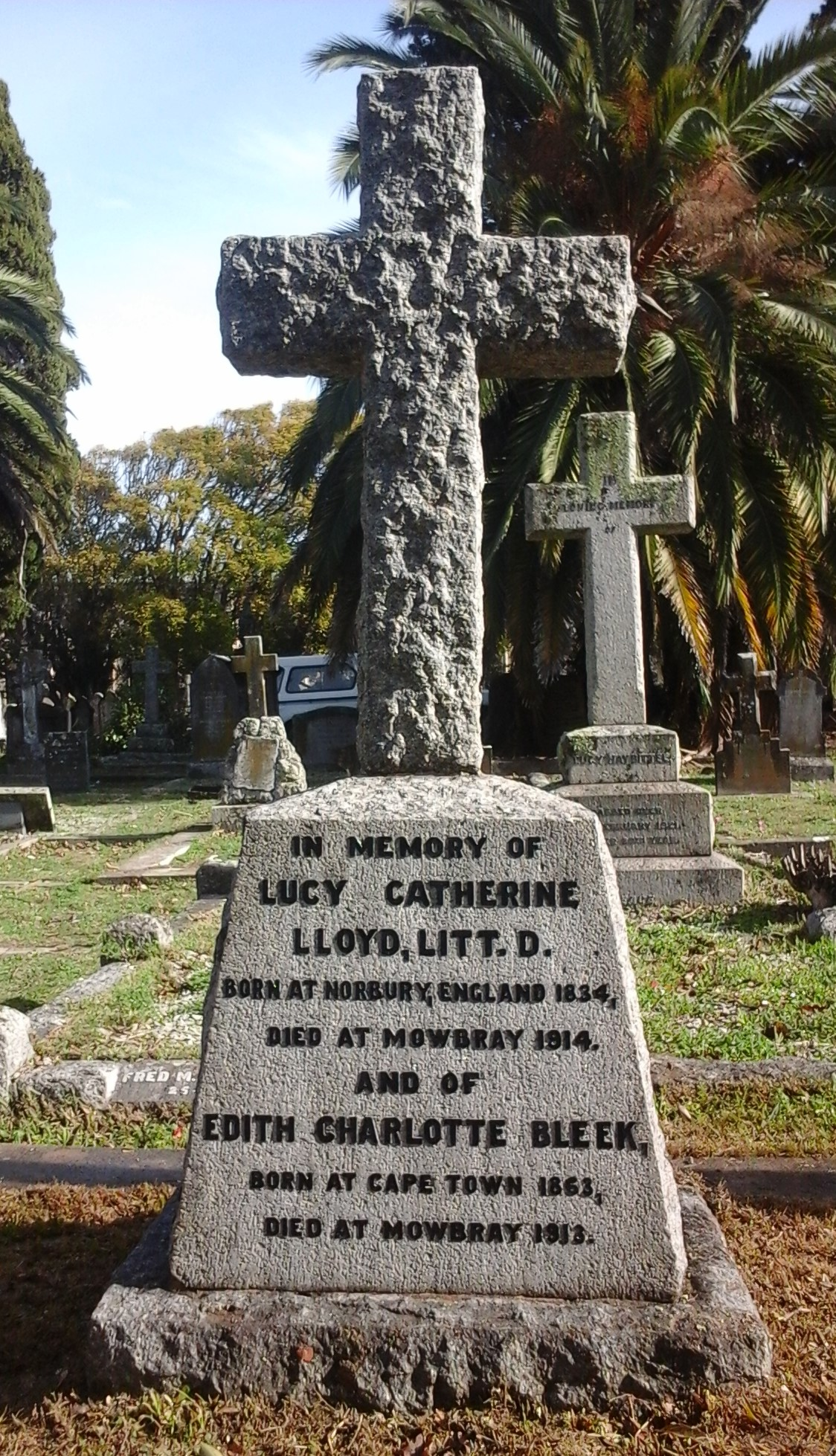
Lucy Lloyd's grave, Wynberg Cemetery, Cape Town

Lucy Lloyd died at Charlton House on 31 August 1914 at the age of 79, and is buried in the Wynberg cemetery in Cape Town near her nieces and nephew and Wilhelm Bleek himself.

== See also ==
- ǃKweiten-ta-ǁKen
- ǁKabbo
