= ǂʼAmkoe language =

Endangered Kxʼa language of Botswana

ǂʼAmkoe
- ǂHoan
- Pronunciation: [ᵑǀˀām̄kòè]
- Native to: Botswana
- Region: Kweneng District
- Native speakers: Western ǂʼAmkoe: 20–50 (2015); Eastern ǂʼAmkoe: unknown
- Language family: Kxʼa: ǂʼAmkoe
- Dialects: Nǃaqriaxe; (Eastern) ǂHoan; Sasi

Language codes
- ISO 639-3: huc
- Glottolog: hoaa1235
- ELP: ǂHoan

ǂʼAmkoe /ˈæmkɔɪ/ AM-koy, formerly called by the dialectal name ǂHoan (alternatively spelled ǂHȍã, ǂHûân, ǂHua, ǂHû, or in native orthography ǂHȍȁn, and also known as Eastern ǂHoan, to distinguish from Western ǂHoan), is a severely endangered Kxʼa language of Botswana. The West ǂʼAmkoe dialect, along with Taa (or perhaps the Tsaasi dialect of Taa) and Gǀui, form the core of the Kalahari Basin sprachbund, and share a number of characteristic features, including the largest consonant inventories in the world. ǂʼAmkoe was shown to be related to the Juu languages by Honken and Heine (2010), and these have since been classified together in the Kxʼa language family.

== Language situation ==
ǂʼAmkoe is moribund, or severely endangered. There are only a few dozen native speakers, most born before 1960 (one Sasi speaker was born in 1971, one Nǃaqriaxe speaker in 1969), many of whom no longer speak the language fluently. The first language of the younger generations, and even of many older, native speakers who no longer speak ǂʼAmkoe well, is Gǀui, a Khoe language, in the case of Nǃaqriaxe; Kgalagadi, a Bantu language that is the local lingua franca, in the case of ǂHoan; and the Ngwato dialect of Tswana, in the case of Sasi.

== Dialects ==
ǂʼAmkoe (IPA: [ᵑǀˀām̄kòè]) is spoken in three areas in southeastern Botswana, corresponding to three dialects. Recent surveys found the following locations:

- Nǃaqriaxe ([ᵑǀàˤɾīāχè]) is spoken in the west of Kweneng District, in the villages of Motokwe, Khekhenye, Tswane, and Dutlwe.
- ǂHoan ([ǂʰòã̀]) is spoken in eastern Kweneng, in the villages of Salajwe, Mathibatsela, and Shorilatholo.
- Sasi ([sààsī] or [sààsí]) is spoken further east, between Kweneng District and the South African border, in the villages of Dibete, Poloka, and a few nearby villages not found on maps.

Nǃaqriaxe and ǂHoan are closest, collectively referred to as West ǂʼAmkoe; Sasi is referred to as East ǂʼAmkoe.

There are some phonological differences between the Nǃaqriaxe spoken around Dutlwe and that spoken around Motokwe and Khekhenye. Sasi is a "mutually intelligible language" with differences in phonology and lexicon. There have been no systematic studies of Sasi, in 2015, Collins was engaged in fieldwork. The East and West populations had no knowledge of each other, but when brought together in 1996, they were able to communicate, and found the differences amusing.

Recent scholars such as Collins, Gruber, Köhler, and Güldemann restrict the name ǂHoan to the ǂHoan dialect, and call the language as a whole ǂʼAmkoe, which means "person" in all dialects. Almost all linguistic work has been on the ǂHoan and Nǃaqriaxe dialects.

ǂHoan has gone by the names and spellings Eastern ǂHoan, ǂHùã, ǂHũa, ǂHṍã, ǂHoang de Dutlwe. It has been specified as Eastern ǂHoan to distinguish it from Western ǂHuan, a dialect of the unrelated Taa language. Sasi has gone by Sàsí, Tshasi, Tshasi de Khutse. Tshasi is a Tswana name that is more precise than the generic Masarwa "Bushman". The disambiguator de Khutse is used to distinguish it from a variety of Taa also called Tshase and Sase. The name of the third dialect is nǃàqrīāχè ([ǃ̃àˤɾīāχè]) or àqrīāχè ([ʔàˤɾīāχè]) in ǂʼAmkoe.

All Nǃaqriaxe speakers are bilingual in Gǀui, with some Kgalagadi as well. ǂHoan speakers are bilingual in Kgalagadi, and Sasi speakers in the Ngwato dialect of Tswana. The ǂʼAmkoe language shows evidence that it previously had extensive contact with Taa. Superimposed on this are Gǀui features such as a shift of alveolar consonants to palatal, even in ǂHoan, which is not currently in contact with Gǀui.

== Phonology ==
ǂʼAmkoe has bilabial clicks, which are found in only two other living languages. It has been in intense contact with Gǀui and previously with Taa, and some of the sounds of ǂʼAmkoe appear to have been borrowed from Gǀui. On the other hand, the moribund state of the language is apparent in its phonology, and sounds not found in Gǀui appear to have been lost by many of the remaining speakers.

=== Vowels ===
Nǃaqriaxe vowel qualities are /i e a o u/. The front vowels, /i e/, are very similar in formant space, as are even more so the back vowels, /o u/, but minimal pairs distinguish them. Vowels may be nasalized, pharyngealized (written with a final ⟨q⟩ in the practical orthography), or glottalized. Gerlach (2015) treats long vowels as sequences, in which the nasalized vowels, /ĩ ã ũ/, occur phonemically only as V2, while the pharyngealized and glottalized vowels, /aˤ oˤ/ and /aˀ oˀ uˀ/ (and, in one loan word, /iˀ/) occur only as V1. A vowel at V1 will be phonetically nasalized if V2 is nasal, though combinations of glottalized or pharyngealized plus nasalized vowels are not common. Some speakers glottalize pharyngeal vowels, but inconsistently, and it does not appear to be distinctive. Breathy vowels occur after aspirated consonants and with some speakers at the ends of utterances. Neither case is phonemic. They may also occur on some words with low tone. Not all words with low tone are attested with breathy vowels, but the feature does not appear to be distinctive (there are no minimal pairs), and so Gerlach (2015) does not treat breathy vowels as phonemic. /o/ is a diphthong [oa] before final /m/ (that is, in words of the shape Com), but it carries only a single tone, and so is analyzed as an allophone of a single /o/ vowel. This diphthongization occurs in all three dialects, and also in Gǀui, which probably got it from ǂʼAmkoe.

Honken (2013), which is based on Gruber (1973), says the ǂHȍã qualities, also /a e i o u/, may be modal, breathy, laryngealized, or pharyngealized, and that all may be nasalized.

In words of the shape CVV, attested vowel sequences (considering only vowel quality) are aa, ee, ii, oo, uu, ai, ui, eo, oa, ua. Basically, vowel one is normally /a/ or /o/; an /o/ becomes /u/ before a high vowel two (such as /i/), while an /a/ becomes /e/ or /i/ consonant one is dental/palatal or if vowel two is high. These patterns may be an influence of ǀGui (Honken 2013).

=== Tone ===
Tone in ǂʼAmkoe shows acoustic characteristics of both neighbouring consonants and vowel phonation. Gerlach (2015) analyzes Nǃaqriaxe as having three phonemic tones: low (L), mid (M), and high (H). Monosyllabic words with CVV, CVN shapes have two tones. In disyllabic words of CV.CV shape, six tone combinations are found: a word may have a mid tone or go up or down between adjacent tones, but L.H and H.L are not attested, and the only falling tone is ML. All syllable-final tones in Gerlach's data are falling, perhaps an effect of utterance-final prosody. The system is very similar to that of Gǀui, Gerlach's analysis was based on data from a single speaker who speaks more Gǀui than ǂʼAmkoe and who lacks ǂʼAmkoe consonants not found in Gǀui, so it's not clear that the results are representative of ǂʼAmkoe as a whole.

The tones analyzed as rising phonemically are phonetically dipping (falling-rising). Voiced and aspirated consonants are tone depressors, with high tone at the level of mid after a tenuis or glottalized consonant, and mid at the level of low. (However, the endpoint of low>mid tone does not change, and so effectively becomes low>high.) Aspirated consonants (and especially delayed-aspirated clicks) have an additional depressive effect at the beginning of the tone, so that they are phonetically rising; the contour, however, is a sharp rise at the beginning, rather than the slow descent with a sharp rise at the end of the phonemically rising tones.

Collins (2012) describes six word tones for ǂHȍã dialect: extra high, high-mid (high level), mid-low (mid level), high-low, low-mid, and low level. The extra high tones mostly occurs on high vowels, /i u/, which have an allophonic pitch-raising effect, whereas low level occurs after voiced consonants, which have a tone depressor effect. Given that Collins did not control for initial consonants in his analysis, his description is consistent with Gerlach's for Nǃaqriaxe dialect.

=== Consonants ===
Gerlach (2012) reports different consonant inventories for different speakers of Nǃaqriaxe dialect: A smaller one, similar to that of the neighboring Gǀui language and to previous accounts, is used by most speakers, including those who speak more Gǀui than ǂʼAmkoe. A larger inventory is believed to be more conservative, with pre-voiced consonants cognate to those of the related Ju languages and therefore perhaps dating back to proto-Kxʼa, but lost under Gǀui influence as the language became moribund. (These additional consonants are shaded in the table below.) Similar consonants are found in the neighboring Taa language; it is not clear if they date to proto-Tuu, and perhaps an earlier era of contact, or if Taa might have gotten them from ǂʼAmkoe.

The egressive consonants found in word-initial (C1) position in lexical words are as follows. Those in parentheses are only found in loan words. Those with a shaded background are only used by speakers Gerlach (2015) believes are conservative:

Non-click consonants found in C1 position in lexical words
			Labial	Alveolar		Post- alveolar	Palatal	Velar	Uvular	Glottal
Nasal			(m)	(n)			ɲ (rare)			
Plosive	voiced		b (rare)	(d)	dz	dʒ	ɟ	ɡ	ᶰɢ (rare)	
Plosive	tenuis		(p)	(t)	ts	tʃ	c	k	q	ʔ (epenthetic?)
Plosive	aspirated	voiceless	(pʰ)	(tʰ)	tsʰ	tʃʰ	cʰ	kʰ	qʰ	
Plosive	aspirated	voiced			dzʰ					
Plosive	ejective	voiceless			tsʼ	tʃʼ	cʼ (rare)	kʼ (rare)	qχʼ	
Plosive	ejective	voiced			dzʼ			ɡʼ	ɢʁʼ	
Plosive	uvularized	voiceless			(tsᵡ)?	(tʃᵡ)?	(cᵡ)?			
Plosive	uvularized	voiceless			tsqχʼ	tʃqχʼ	cqχʼ			
Plosive	uvularized	voiced			dzqχʼ					
Fricative					s				(χ)?	(h)
Approximant			(w)	(ɾ) (l)						

The shaded consonants have a voiced hold and voiceless release, [dsʰ, dsʼ, ɡkʼ, ɢχʼ, dsqχʼ]. Gerlach (2015) analyses the change of voicing as being a phonetic detail due to the nature of the release rather than being phonemically prevoiced. The post-alveolar affricates (/tʃ/ etc.) are conflated with the alveolar affricates (/ts/ etc.) in Nǃaqriaxe dialect. They are probably an old distinction that's been lost in Nǃaqriaxe. Where they do occur, they may be alveolo-palatal ([tɕ], etc.), depending on speaker and location. /χ, tsχ, cχ/ appear to be only found in Gǀui loans. Sasi has /qʼ/ rather than the /qχʼ/ of ǂHoan and Nǃaqriaxe, though Sasi /qʼ/ is sometimes slightly affricated. (The same pattern holds for Sasi contour clicks with /qʼ/.) A contrastive /qʼ/ was reported by Gruber (1975) from a word or two in ǂHoan dialect, but could not be confirmed in Nǃaqriaxe, and cross-linguistic comparison gives reason to believe that /qʼ/ and /qχʼ/ are the same consonant.

/dz/ frequently appears as a fricative ([z] or further back). /c/ and /ɟ/ have a slightly fricated release, [cᶜ̧] or [kᶜ̧] etc., and aspirated /cʰ/ is distinguished primarily in the frication being longer than for /c/. /q/ ([qᵡ]) is similar, and [qχʼ] might be better analyzed as /qʼ/. It is sometimes pronounced as a lateral /q𝼄̠ʼ/, though not as commonly as in Gǀui. /k/ is not found in many lexical words apart from loans, but does occur in some highly frequent grammatical words. /χ/ is rare, and may be restricted to loans (this is not yet clear). Glottal stop [ʔ] could be argued to be epenthetic on an onsetless syllable rather than phonemic.

Consonants found in word-medial (C2) position are /b/ (often [β]), /m, n, ɾ/; the phonemic status of medial [w] in one word is unclear. /ŋ/ is rare, found word-finally in a few loanwords. An additional consonant, /j/, is found as the first consonant of some grammatical markers.

The palatal series, which is most developed in ǂHȍã dialect, derive historically from dental consonants. This appears to be a regional influence from Gǀui, where it has also happened in some dialects more than other. Among ǂʼAmkoe dialects, there has been no palatalization in Sisa (/n d t tʰ tʼ tχ tqχʼ/), palatalization of most alveolar consonants in Nǃaqriaxe (/ɲ ɟ c cʰ cʼ tχ tqχʼ/), and full palatalization in ǂHoan (/ɲ ɟ c cʰ cʼ cχ cqχʼ/). The shift of /n/ > /ɲ/ only took place in lexical words; in grammatical words, only /n/ is found.

/h/ is frequently a voiced (murmured) [ɦ], and has been described as being "absorbed" into the following vowel.

==== Clicks ====
Like the Tuu languages, with which it was previously classified, ǂʼAmkoe has five click "types": bilabial, dental, alveolar, palatal, and lateral alveolar. There are 14 to 19 "accompaniments" (combinations of manner, phonation, and contour), depending on the speaker. As with non-clicks, the difference is in whether the speaker retains pre-voiced clicks like those found in the Ju languages and Taa. The result is 68 to 77 click consonants. (Theoretically, the numbers may be 70 and 95, as several clicks shown here were unattested in Gerlach 2012 but have since proven to be accidental gaps, and some or all of the gaps below are likely to be accidental as well. This is especially so considering that the pre-voiced clicks are attested from only a single speaker, for whom extensive data is not available, and that the delayed-aspirated series has not been reported from ǂHoan.) Gerlach (2015) finds the following inventory, considering Nǃaqriaxe and ǂHoan dialects:

Click consonants
Manner and phonation	'Noisy' clicks			'Sharp' clicks	
Manner and phonation	bilabial	dental	lateral	alveolar	palatal
Voiced nasal	ᵑʘ	ᵑǀ	ᵑǁ	ᵑǃ	ᵑǂ
Preglottalized voiced nasal	ˀᵑʘ	ˀᵑǀ	ˀᵑǁ	ˀᵑǃ	ˀᵑǂ
Voiced oral	ᶢʘ	ᶢǀ	ᶢǁ	ᶢǃ	ᶢǂ
Tenuis oral	ᵏʘ	ᵏǀ	ᵏǁ	ᵏǃ	ᵏǂ
Aspirated oral	ᵏʘʰ	ᵏǀʰ	ᵏǁʰ	ᵏǃʰ	ᵏǂʰ
Voiced aspirated oral		ᶢǀʰ	ᶢǁʰ		
Ejective	ʘᵏʼ	ǀᵏʼ	ǁᵏʼ	ǃᵏʼ	ǂᵏʼ
Voiced ejective	ᶢʘᵏʼ	ᶢǀᵏʼ		ᶢǃᵏʼ	
Glottalized (prenasalized between vowels)	ᵑʘˀ	ᵑǀˀ	ᵑǁˀ	ᵑǃˀ	ᵑǂˀ
Delayed aspiration (prenasalized between vowels)			ᵑǁʰ𐞁	ᵑǃʰ𐞁	ᵑǂʰ𐞁
Contour clicks (uvular)
Tenuis	ʘq	ǀq	ǁq	ǃq	ǂq
Voiced (sporadically prenasalized)	ᶰᶢʘq	ᶰᶢǀq	ᶰᶢǁq	ᶰᶢǃq	ᶰᶢǂq
Aspirated	ʘqʰ	ǀqʰ	ǁqʰ	ǃqʰ	ǂqʰ
Voiced aspirated		ᶢǀqʰ			
Ejective	ʘqʼ	ǀqʼ	ǁqʼ	ǃqʼ	ǂqʼ
Voiced ejective		ᶢǀqʼ	ᶢǁqʼ		
Affricate	(ʘχ)?	(ǀχ)?	(ǁχ)?	(ǃχ)?	(ǂχ)?
Ejective affricate	ʘqχʼ	ǀqχʼ	ǁqχʼ	ǃqχʼ	ǂqχʼ
Voiced ejective affricate	ᶢʘqχʼ		ᶢǁqχʼ		ᶢǂqχʼ

The unusual distinction between glottalized and ejective clicks is similar to that found in Gǀui. A near minimal set is ǁʼòò 'warm', ᵑǁˀōō 'hard', ǁqʼòò 'to stink'. It has not been reported from ǂHoan, but this is likely to have been an oversight. The ejective clicks are not prenasalized between vowels, while the glottalized clicks, and clicks with delayed aspiration, are. Voicing of the voiced uvular clicks is variable. They are sporadically prenasalized, even in initial position, which many investigators believe is due to the difficulty of maintaining the voicing.

Like /χ/ etc. above, the plain click affricates /ʘχ, ǀχ, ǁχ, ǃχ, ǂχ/ appear to be found only in Gǀui loans.

With the voiceless aspirated clicks, voicing starts partway through the aspiration, [ǃʰʱ], so the voice-onset time is not as long as that of the glottalized clicks. With the voiced aspirated clicks, the aspiration is generally voiced throughout, but voicing decreases during the hold of the click, and the release itself is voiceless, unlike the release of modally voiced clicks. (That is, these are better described as pre-voiced aspirated clicks.) For the clicks with delayed aspiration, the aspiration is quite long, starting out weak and increasing in intensity with time (unlike the aspiration of the simple aspirated clicks, which starts out strong and decreases in intensity). When the click is in utterance-initial position, there is no voicing in the hold or in the aspiration. However, when the click occurs after a vowel, it is nasal throughout the hold, ending just before the release, but with voicing continuing though the release and throughout the aspiration: [ǃ˭ʰ] vs [ŋ͡nǃ̬ʱʱ]. The preglottalized clicks have a much shorter voice lead (negative VOT) than the plain nasal clicks, sometimes hardly audible.

=== Phonotactics ===
A lexical word is typically of the shapes CVV (69% in Nǃaqriaxe dialect), CVN (8%), or CVCV (22%, often loans from Gǀui), with two tone-bearing units. (Only 1% of words are CVCVCV, CVVCV, CVVVCV, and other complex patterns.) The N may only be /m/ in native words, though final /n/ occurs in loans. Gerlach (2015) believes that the CVV and CVN patterns derive historically from *CVCV through loss of C2 (such as a medial /l/ in related languages) or V2 in all cases, not just those that can be shown.

In lexical words, most consonants occur in C1 position, but only /b m n r/ occur in C2 position. /ɾ/ may be realized as [d] or [l], and /b/ may be realized as [β]. (A few words have a third-position consonant, CVCVCV or CVVCV. These include /b m r l k q ts s/, and may be a fossilized suffixes.) /w/? occurs as C2 in one word, /kawa/ 'bag', but its analysis is uncertain - the word may be /kaua/, with a CVVV structure, and perhaps a loan. /m n ɾ/ do not occur in C1 position except in loanwords. Initial /ɾ/ may be a trill [r] when it is a trill in the source language. /b/ occurs as C1 in only a few native words, /ɲ/ (C1 only) is rare, and final /ŋ/ is only found in loans. /j/ does not occur in lexical words, except for some speakers as the realization of /ɲ/.

In grammatical words, the word shape is usually CV, sometimes CVV (generally shortening to CV in rapid speech), or, in two cases, N (both /m/ and /n/). Attested consonants in grammatical words are /ʔ j w m n k q s h ᵑǀ ᵑǃ ˀᵑǁ ǀʰ ǁ/. Of these, /j w m n/ do not occur as C1 in lexical words, while /ʔ k/ are rare. Thus there is a strong tendency for some consonants to mark the beginning of a lexical word, and for others to start grammatical words. (Though /w/ may be realized as [β] and might be phonemically /b/.) In grammatical words, clicks are mostly found in CVV and CVq (pharyngealized) syllables, though there is a plural suffix -/ᵑǀe/. /h/ is sometimes pharyngealized to [ħ] in suffixes. At least /χ, l, k, s, c/ occur as C2 in loan words.

== Grammar ==
ǂHõã is an SVO subject–verb–object language (see examples in Collins 2001, 2002, 2003). The SVO word order of ǂHõã typical of the Kxʼa and Tuu language families. ǂHõã has nominal postpositions used for locative relations (see Collins 2001), and the possessor precedes the head noun.

ǂHõã grammar is characterized by a number of features common to the Kxʼa and Tuu languages. First there is an intricate system of nominal plurality and verbal pluractionality. Second, there is a system of verbal compounds. Third, there is a general-purpose preposition (referred to as the "linker" in Collins 2003) which appears between post-verbal constituents.

== Bibliography ==
- Bell, Arthur; Collins, Chris (2001). "ǂHoan and the Typology of Click Accompaniments in Khoisan". Cornell Working Papers in Linguistics. 18: 126–153.
- Collins, Chris; Gruber, Jeff (2013). A Grammar of ǂHȍã with Vocabulary, Recorded Utterances and Oral Texts. Cologne: Rüdiger Köppe Verlag.
- Collins, Chris (2001). "Aspects of Plurality in ǂHoan". Language. 77 (3): 456–476. doi:10.1353/lan.2001.0141. S2CID 144653016.
- Collins, Chris (2002). "Multiple Verb Movement in ǂHoan". Linguistic Inquiry. 33 (1): 1–29. doi:10.1162/002438902317382161. S2CID 57564816.
- Collins, Chris (2003). "The Internal Structure of VP in Juǀʼhoan and ǂHoan". Studia Linguistica. 57 (1): 1–25. doi:10.1111/1467-9582.00095.
- Gerlach, Linda (2015). Phonetic and phonological description of the Nǃaqriaxe variety of ǂʼAmkoe and the impact of language contact (PhD dissertation). Berlin: Humboldt University.
- Gruber, Jeffrey S. (1973). "ǂHṑã Kinship Terms". Linguistic Inquiry. 4: 427–449. JSTOR 4177787.
- Gruber, Jeffrey S. 1975. Plural Predicates in ǂHòã. In Bushman and Hottentot Linguistic Studies, A.S.I. Communication 2, ed. Anthony Traill, 1–50. University of the Witwatersrand, Johannesburg: African Studies Institute.
- Gruber, Jeffrey S. (1975). Bushman Languages of the Kalahari: ǂHòã - Vocabulary -Stems, ǂHòã - Vocabulary - Recorded Utterances (Report). Washington, DC: National Endowment for the Humanities.
- Gruber, Jeffrey S. 1975. Collected Field Notes. (Published in Collins & Gruber 2013)
- Traill, Anthony (1973). "N4 or S7: Another Bushman Language". African Studies. 32: 25–32. doi:10.1080/00020187308707394.
- Traill, Anthony (1979). Snyman, J. W. (ed.). "Phonetic Diversity in the Khoisan Languages". Bushman and Hottentot Linguistic Studies. Pretoria: University of South Africa: 167–189.
- Traill, Anthony (1973). "Westphal on 'N4 or S7?': A Reply". African Studies. 33 (4): 249–255. doi:10.1080/00020187408707439.
