= Gǀui dialect =

Khoe dialect of Botswana

Gǀui
- Pronunciation: [ᶢǀúi]
- Native to: Botswana
- Ethnicity: 1,500 Gǀui (2013)
- Native speakers: 1,500 (2013); 1,500 all Gǁana dialects (2011)
- Language family: Khoe–Kwadi: Khoe; Kalahari (Tshu–Khwe); West; Gǁana; Gǀui

Language codes
- ISO 639-3: gwj
- Glottolog: gwii1239
- ELP: |Gui

Gǀui or Gǀwi (pronounced /ˈɡwiː/ GWEE in English, and also spelled ǀGwi, ǀ᪶Ui, Dcui, Gcwi, or Cgui) is a Khoe dialect of Botswana with 2,500 speakers (2004 Cook). It is part of the Gǁana dialect cluster, and is closely related to Naro. It has a number of loan words from ǂʼAmkoe. Gǀui, ǂʼAmkoe, and Taa form the core of the Kalahari Basin sprachbund, and share a number of characteristic features, including extremely large consonant inventories.

== Phonology ==
Gǀui has 93 consonants (with 56 clicks) or 52 consonants (and 20 clicks), depending on analysis. There are ten vowels, and two to six tones, again depending on analysis.

=== Clicks ===
Gǀui has 24 simple click consonants, plus complex clicks variously analyzed as consonant clusters or airstream contours. As with many of the Tshu–Khwe languages, clicks have lost some of their importance under the influence of neighboring Bantu languages. Many words which previously began with clicks (as shown by cognates in related languages) have lost them over the past few centuries in Gǀui. Nonetheless, Gǀui has the largest known inventory of clicks of any Khoe language.

Gǀui has been described with a contrast between velar and uvular clicks. However, all Gǀui clicks are uvular (or pharyngeal); the 'uvular' part of the latter is part of an airstream contour, a transition from a click to a non-click release: effectively, the click transitions into a non-click consonant. (See Nǁng language for a similar situation in another language.) Nakagawa proposes that the contour and glottalized clicks are not single sounds, but sequences of a click and a uvular or glottal consonant, though Miller (2011) notes that such an analysis creates problems when extended to other languages with clicks.

Altogether there are thirteen such series, or "accompaniments", and all 52 possible combinations are found. Except for the lack of bilabial clicks, the inventory is nearly identical to that of some speakers of ǂʼAmkoe, which is in intense contact with Gǀui and may have borrowed some of its clicks from Gǀui, and lost others not found in Gǀui.

Miller (2011), in a comparative study with other languages, interprets Nakagawa's description as follows. (Nakagawa's ⟨kǃʔ⟩ and ⟨ǃqxʼ⟩ are analyzed as [ᵑǃˀ] and [ǃ͡kxʼ], respectively.)

		affricated clicks		'sharp' clicks	
		dental	lateral	alveolar	palatal
Simple clicks	voiced	ᶢǀ	ᶢǁ	ᶢǃ	ᶢǂ
Simple clicks	tenuis	ᵏǀ	ᵏǁ	ᵏǃ	ᵏǂ
Simple clicks	aspirated	ᵏǀʰ	ᵏǁʰ	ᵏǃʰ	ᵏǂʰ
Simple clicks	glottalized oral	ᵏǀʼ	ᵏǁʼ	ᵏǃʼ	ᵏǂʼ
Simple clicks	nasal	ᵑǀ	ᵑǁ	ᵑǃ	ᵑǂ
Simple clicks	voiceless aspirated nasal	ᵑ̊ǀʰ	ᵑ̊ǁʰ	ᵑ̊ǃʰ	ᵑ̊ǂʰ
Simple clicks	glottalized nasal	ᵑǀˀ	ᵑǁˀ	ᵑǃˀ	ᵑǂˀ
Contours	(prenasalized) voiced	ᶢǀ͡ɢ	ᶢǁ͡ɢ	ᶢǃ͡ɢ	ᶢǂ͡ɢ
Contours	tenuis	ǀ͡q	ǁ͡q	ǃ͡q	ǂ͡q
Contours	aspirated	ǀ͡qʰ	ǁ͡qʰ	ǃ͡qʰ	ǂ͡qʰ
Contours	voiceless fricative	ǀ͡χ	ǁ͡χ	ǃ͡χ	ǂ͡χ
Contours	ejective	ǀ͡qʼ	ǁ͡qʼ	ǃ͡qʼ	ǂ͡qʼ
Contours	uvular affricate	ǀ͡qχ	ǁ͡qχ	ǃ͡qχ	ǂ͡qχ
Contours	uvular ejective affricate	ǀ͡qχʼ	ǁ͡qχʼ	ǃ͡qχʼ	ǂ͡qχʼ

The voiced contour ('uvular') clicks tend to be prenasalized, [ɴǃɢ]. As in the majority of languages with clicks, the glottalized nasal series /ᵑǃˀ/ are pronounced with a glottal release [ǃˀ] in initial position, and prenasalized [ᵑˀǃ] after a vowel. The contrast between glottalized oral and glottalized nasal clicks is unusual, but has also been reported from ǂʼAmkoe and Yeyi since Nakagawa announced its discovery in Gǀui. The Khute dialect of Gǀui also has preglottalized nasal clicks allophonically. They developed from glottalized nasal clicks before pharyngealized vowels, perhaps under ǂʼAmkoe influence:

Preglottalized nasal clicks in Khute dialect
Khute Gǀui	other Gǀui	English
[ˀᵑǂúˤrī]	[ᵑǂˀúˤrī]	"adam's apple" (pharyngealized vowel)
[ᵑǂˀúbī]	[ᵑǂˀúbī]	"egg" (modal vowel)

=== Other consonants ===
Gǀui consonants
		Bilabial	Alveolar		Palatal	Velar	Uvular	Glottal
		Bilabial	plain	affric.	Palatal	Velar	Uvular	Glottal
Nasal		m	n			(ŋ)		
Plosive	voiceless	p	t	ts	c	k	q	ʔ
Plosive	voiced	b	d	dz	ɟ	g	ɢ	
Plosive	aspirated	pʰ	tʰ	tsʰ	cʰ	kʰ	qʰ	
Plosive	ejective		(tʼ)	tsʼ	cʼ	kʼ, kxʼ	qʼ	
Uvular affrication	plain		tχ	tsχ				
Uvular affrication	ejective		tqχʼ	tsqχʼ				
Fricative				s			χ	h
Approximant		w	ɾ~l		j			

Most words are of the form CV, CVV, CVCV, CVN, where C stands for a consonant, V for a vowel, and N for a nasal consonant /m, n/. In CVCV words, only a limited set of consonants /b m ɾ n j w/ may occur in medial position (the second syllable). Of these, two /n, ɾ/ may not occur at the beginning of a word, and due to restrictions with nasal vowels may be argued to be allophonic. The /n, ɾ/ is pronounced [l] after a lateral click or a pharyngeal vowel. /ŋ/ only occurs in mimesis. /tʼ/ occurs in a single word, t'aa 'to carve', which is not widely known.

The palatals, which are unique among Khoisan languages to Gǁana-Gǀui, derive historically from the alveolars before non-pharyngealized vowels. In Gǁana this shift has only partly occurred.

/tqχʼ/ and /tsqχʼ/ have also been analyzed as /tχʼ/ and /tsχʼ/, the ejective homologues of /tχ/ and /tsχ/. However, their pronunciation is [tqχʼ] and [tsqχʼ].

=== Vowels ===
Gǀui has five modal vowels, /a e i o u/, three nasal vowels, /ã ẽ õ/, and two pharyngeal vowels, /aˤ oˤ/. There are diphthongs [o͜a] and [o͜aˤ], but they are allophones of /o/. Gǀui also has breathy-voice vowels, but they are described as part of the tone system.

Only the five modal vowels /a e i o u/ occur in monomoraic (CV or V) roots, which except for the noun χò 'thing, place, case' are all grammatical morphemes. These are reduced to three nasal vowels /ã ẽ õ/ after nasal consonants, including the glottalized nasal clicks.

The modal vowels and the pharyngeal vowels, /aˤ oˤ/o͜aˤ/, occur as the first vowel (V1) of bimoraic roots, CVCV, CVV, and CVN, though the modal vowels are reduced to /a e i o͜a/ before a nasal coda, CVN. This [o͜a] corresponds to /o/ in Gǁana. Pharyngeal /oˤ/ and [o͜aˤ] are also in complementary distribution: [oˤ] in CVV words and [o͜aˤ] in CVCV and CVN words; some speakers use [o͜aˤ] in CVV roots too, so that their pharyngeal vowels are reduced to [aˤ o͜aˤ].

The modal and nasal vowels (but not the pharyngeals) occur as the second vowel (V2) of bimoraic roots, CVCV or CVV, though only modal vowels may follow the medial consonants /b ɾ/, and only nasal vowels follow the medial consonants /m n/. Either oral or nasal vowels may follow /j w/ or null (CVV roots). That is, medial /m n/ may be seen as allophones of /b ɾ/.

The initial consonant (C1) may be any but /n ɾ/. The medial consonant (C2) may be /b ɾ m n j w/. N may be /m n/.

There are other vowel restrictions. V1 is always /i/ in CVCV words when C1 is non-click palatal, for example. (This is because those sounds arose historically from alveolars followed by /i/, which are still found in Naro.) Uvular(ized) consonants cause vowel lowering.

=== Tone ===
Gǀui may be analyzed as having two abstract phonemic tones, plus breathy voice, which is covered here rather than under vowels.

Monosyllabic morphemes carry one of two tones, high and low. Bimoraic roots carry one of six tones: high-level, high-mid (or "high falling"), mid-low (or "mid"), low-mid dipping/rising, high falling (or "falling"), and low falling (or "low"). Low falling and low-mid are accompanied by a breathy voice phonation, the other four with a clear phonation. The high and low falling tones form a natural class, triggering for example a high tone on the suffix -si, whereas the other four root tones trigger a low tone on -si.

That is, there are two tones on CV and V roots; two tones on bimoraic roots with breathy vowels, one of them falling; and four tones on bimoraic roots with other vowels, one of them falling. Thus there are four phonemic tones on CVCV, CVV, and CVN roots, the number expected if there are two possible tones on each mora, with moraic N carrying tone, though their contours are not simple juxtapositions of high/low + high/low.

== Dialects ==
- Khute
- Standard Gǀwi
