= Glottalized click =

Type of click consonant

Alveolar glottalized nasal click

ᵑ̊ǃˀ

Dental glottalized oral click

ǀˀ

Lateral glottalized voiced nasal click

ᵑǁˀ

Palatal glottalized voiced oral click

ᶢǂˀ

Preglottalized labial nasal click

ˀᵑʘ

Glottalized clicks are click consonants pronounced with closure of the glottis. All click types (bilabial ʘ, dental ǀ, alveolar ǃ, lateral ǁ, palatal ǂ, and retroflex 𝼊) have glottalized variants. They are very common: All of the Khoisan languages of Africa have them (the Khoe, Tuu, and Kxʼa language families, Sandawe, and Hadza), as does Dahalo and the Bantu languages Yeyi and Xhosa (though Zulu does not). They are produced by making a glottal stop (the catch in the throat in the middle of English uh-oh!), which stops the flow of air, and then using the front of the tongue to make the click sound in the middle of the glottal stop.

== Glottalized nasal clicks ==
In all languages which have them, glottalized clicks are nasalized, though a few have non-nasal glottalized clicks as well. Glottalized nasal clicks are formed by closing the glottis so that the click is pronounced in silence; however, the nasal passage is left open (the velum is lowered), and any preceding vowel will be nasalized. They are typically transcribed something like !’ or ŋ!’ or ŋ̊!’, and often !’ word-initially but n!’ between vowels. In Khoekhoe they are written with the single letters ǃ ǁ ǀ ǂ, in Juǀ’hõa, as ǃ’ ǁ’ ǀ’ ǂ’ with a preceding nasal vowel, in Sandawe as q’ x’ c’, in Hadza as qq xx cc, and in Xhosa as nkc nkx nkq.

When full glottal closure is made, there is no nasal airflow during the click itself, and there is a period of silence after the click and before the pronunciation of the vowel. That is, they are pronounced [!͡ʔ], etc. In many languages, however, the glottal closure is not complete, in which case they are pronounced with accompanying voiceless nasal airflow and transcribed ⟨ŋ̊!ʔ⟩, etc. A more general transcription is ⟨ᵑ!ˀ⟩; superscripting the nasal and glottal components indicates that they are articulated simultaneously with the click and not adjacent to it.

Initially and in citation form, the nasal component may be inaudible. That is, in this position glottalized clicks differ from plain (tenuis) clicks in the gap between click and vowel (the voice onset time), and from aspirated clicks in that this gap is silent rather than noisy. In canonical form, a glottal stop occurs between the release of the click and the start of the following vowel. In practice, though, the glottalization often 'leaks', with a creaky-voiced transition into the vowel. However, in medial position or embedded in a phrase after a vowel the nasalization can usually be heard: any preceding vowel will be nasalized or the click will be prenasalized. This is somewhat similar to aspirated nasal clicks, though in the later case the nasal airflow continues through the click itself. In neither case is the following vowel normally nasalized, something which occurs with simple nasal clicks in languages like Gǀui.

== Ejective clicks ==
In a few languages—Gǀui, Taa, ǂ’Amkoe, and, in Miller's analysis, Yeyi—there is in addition a series of oral, non-contour glottalized clicks. These have been described as ejective in the cases of Gǀui and Taa, and Nakagawa (2006) transcribes the two series of glottalized clicks as glottalized [k!ʔ] ([ŋ̊!ʔ] in earlier publications) vs. ejective [k!’]. Miller (2011) treats them as differing in nasality ([ŋ̊!ʔ] and [k!ʔ]) rather than in the type of glottalization. Miller treats the glottalization in these clicks as phonation, so that both oral and nasal clicks occur with five phonations: tenuis, voiced, aspirated, murmured (breathy voiced), and glottalized.

== Other types of glottalized clicks ==
Other series of glottalized clicks have only been reported from two languages, Taa and ǂ’Amkoe. Taa distinguishes the singular and plural of many nouns via a voiceless vs. voiced initial consonant, and thus there are voiced and voiceless versions of the glottalized nasal and oral clicks. In the voiced versions the glottalization is delayed, so that the hold of the click is partially voiced or nasalized: that is, [ǃˀa] vs. [ᶢǃʔa] and [ᵑ!ˀa] vs [ᵑ!ʔa]. The release of the voiced glottal click is "creaky", as the voiceless nasal often is. In Miller's treatment of phonation, this is perhaps a morphological contrast superimposed on the basic five-phonation system.

== Preglottalized nasal clicks ==
A few languages also have preglottalized nasal clicks. These are pronounced like ordinary voiced nasal clicks, but are preceded by a very short period of prenasalization that has a glottal-stop onset. They are considered unitary consonants, and not sequences of glottal stop plus nasal click. They are reported from Taa, Ekoka !Kung, and ǂ’Amkoe. (Taa and Ekoka !Kung also have preglottalized nasals /ˀm, ˀn/.) In one dialect of Gǀui, glottalized nasal clicks before pharyngealized vowels have become preglottalized nasal clicks, perhaps under the influence of ǂ’Amkoe.

== See also ==
- Nasal click
- Pulmonic-contour click
- Ejective-contour click

| Place → | Labial | | | | | Coronal | | | | | | | | | | Dorsal | | | | | Laryngeal | | | |
| Manner ↓ | Bilabial | | Labiodental | | Linguolabial | | Dental | | Alveolar | | Postalveolar | | Retroflex | | (Alveolo-)palatal | | Velar | | Uvular | | Pharyngeal/epiglottal | | Glottal | |
|---|---|---|---|---|---|---|---|---|---|---|---|---|---|---|---|---|---|---|---|---|---|---|---|---|
| Nasal | m̥ | m | ɱ̊ | ɱ | | n̼ | n̪̊ | n̪ | n̥ | n | n̠̊ | n̠ | ɳ̊ | ɳ | ɲ̊ | ɲ | ŋ̊ | ŋ | ɴ̥ | ɴ | | | | |
| Plosive | p | b | p̪ | b̪ | t̼ | d̼ | t̪ | d̪ | t | d | | | ʈ | ɖ | c | ɟ | k | ɡ | q | ɢ | ʡ | | ʔ | |
| Sibilant affricate | | | | | | | ts̪ | dz̪ | ts | dz | tʃ | dʒ | tʂ | dʐ | tɕ | dʑ | | | | | | | | |
| Non-sibilant affricate | pɸ | bβ | p̪f | b̪v | | | tθ | dð | tɹ̝̊ | dɹ̝ | t̠ɹ̝̊ | d̠ɹ̝ | | | cç | ɟʝ | kx | ɡɣ | qχ | ɢʁ | ʡʜ | ʡʢ | ʔh | |
| Sibilant fricative | | | | | | | s̪ | z̪ | s | z | ʃ | ʒ | ʂ | ʐ | ɕ | ʑ | | | | | | | | |
| Non-sibilant fricative | ɸ | β | f | v | θ̼ | ð̼ | θ | ð | θ̠ | ð̠ | ɹ̝̠̊ | ɹ̠᷵ | ɻ̥᷵ | ɻ᷵ | ç | ʝ | x | ɣ | χ | ʁ | ħ | ʕ | h | ɦ |
| Approximant | | β̞ | | ʋ | | | | ð̞ | | ɹ | | ɹ̠ | | ɻ | | j | | ɰ | | | | | | ˷ |
| Tap/flap | | ⱱ̟ | | ⱱ | | | | | ɾ̥ | ɾ | | | ɽ̊ | ɽ | | | | | | ɢ̆ | | ʡ̮ | | |
| Trill | ʙ̥ | ʙ | | | | | | | r̥ | r | | r̠ | ɽ̊r̥ | ɽr | | | | | ʀ̥ | ʀ | ʜ | ʢ | | |
| Lateral affricate | | | | | | | | | tɬ | dɮ | | | tꞎ | d𝼅 | c𝼆 | ɟʎ̝ | k𝼄 | ɡʟ̝ | | | | | | |
| Lateral fricative | | | | | | | ɬ̪ | | ɬ | ɮ | | | ꞎ | 𝼅 | 𝼆 | ʎ̝ | 𝼄 | ʟ̝ | | | | | | |
| Lateral approximant | | | | | | | | l̪ | l̥ | l | | l̠ | ɭ̊ | ɭ | ʎ̥ | ʎ | ʟ̥ | ʟ | | ʟ̠ | | | | |
| Lateral tap/flap | | | | | | | | | ɺ̥ | ɺ | | | 𝼈̊ | 𝼈 | | ʎ̮ | | ʟ̆ | | | | | | |

| | | BL | LD | D | A | PA | RF | P | V | U |
|---|---|---|---|---|---|---|---|---|---|---|
| Implosive | Voiced | ɓ | | | ɗ | | ᶑ | ʄ | ɠ | ʛ |
| Implosive | Voiceless | ɓ̥ | | | ɗ̥ | | ᶑ̊ | ʄ̊ | ɠ̊ | ʛ̥ |
| Ejective | Stop | pʼ | | | tʼ | | ʈʼ | cʼ | kʼ | qʼ |
| Ejective | Affricate | | p̪fʼ | tθʼ | tsʼ | tʃʼ | tʂʼ | tɕʼ | kxʼ | qχʼ |
| Ejective | Fricative | ɸʼ | fʼ | θʼ | sʼ | ʃʼ | ʂʼ | ɕʼ | xʼ | χʼ |
| Ejective | Lateral affricate | | | | tɬʼ | | | c𝼆ʼ | k𝼄ʼ | q𝼄ʼ |
| Ejective | Lateral fricative | | | | ɬʼ | | | | | |
| Click (top: velar; bottom: uvular) | Tenuis | kʘ qʘ | | kǀ qǀ | kǃ qǃ | | k𝼊 q𝼊 | kǂ qǂ | | |
| Click (top: velar; bottom: uvular) | Voiced | ɡʘ ɢʘ | | ɡǀ ɢǀ | ɡǃ ɢǃ | | ɡ𝼊 ɢ𝼊 | ɡǂ ɢǂ | | |
| Click (top: velar; bottom: uvular) | Nasal | ŋʘ ɴʘ | | ŋǀ ɴǀ | ŋǃ ɴǃ | | ŋ𝼊 ɴ𝼊 | ŋǂ ɴǂ | ʞ | |
| Click (top: velar; bottom: uvular) | Tenuis lateral | | | | kǁ qǁ | | | | | |
| Click (top: velar; bottom: uvular) | Voiced lateral | | | | ɡǁ ɢǁ | | | | | |
| Click (top: velar; bottom: uvular) | Nasal lateral | | | | ŋǁ ɴǁ | | | | | |
