= Ejective-contour click =

Type of click consonant

Alveolar linguo-glottalic stop

ǃ͡qʼ

Voiced dental linguo-glottalic stop

ᶢǀ͡qʼ

Lateral linguo-glottalic affricate (homorganic)

ǁ͡χʼ

Palatal linguo-glottalic affricate (heterorganic)

ǂ͡kxʼ

ǂ͡𝼄ʼ

ǂᵸ

Voiced labial linguo-glottalic affricate

ᶢʘ͡kxʼ

ᶢʘˤ

Ejective-contour clicks, also called sequential linguo-glottalic consonants, are consonants that transition from a click to an ejective sound, or more precisely, have an audible delay between the front and rear release of the click. All click types (alveolar ǃ, dental ǀ, lateral ǁ, palatal ǂ, retroflex 𝼊 and labial ʘ) have linguo-glottalic variants, which occur as both stops and affricates, and may be voiced. At least a voiceless linguo-glottalic affricate is attested from all Khoisan languages of southern Africa (the Khoe, Tuu, and Kxʼa language families), as well as from the Bantu language Yeyi from the same area, but they are unattested elsewhere.

== Analysis ==
Traditionally, contour clicks were believed to be uvular in their rear articulation, whereas non-contour clicks were thought to be velar. However, it is now known that all clicks are uvular, at least in the languages which have been investigated, and that the articulation of these clicks is more complex than that of others but no different in location. Linguists now analyze them as either contours (that is, as a transition from one kind of sound to another within a single consonant) or as sequences of a click followed by a uvular consonant (that is, as consonant clusters). See pulmonic-contour clicks for discussion.

== Description ==
Phonetically, a linguo-glottalic consonant is a click in which the forward and rear articulations are released independently. The forward articulation, made with the lips or the front of the tongue, releases with a lingual airstream as in any click. The rear articulation, however, is held longer, and when it is released, it is with a glottalic airstream. (Linguo-pulmonic consonants are similar, except that the second release is pulmonic, as in English consonants.) That is, such consonants have a double release burst, one ingressive (the air pulled in by the tongue) and the other egressive (the air pushed out by the glottis). The rear articulation is involved in both: it helps create the suction that powers the first, and then is itself released for the second. Because the back of the tongue operates in the uvular or pharyngeal part of the mouth to generate the first burst, and the two bursts are very close together in time, the second release is articulated in approximately this same area.

== Types ==
Four series of ejective-contour clicks (as classified by the rear release) are attested. There are two manners of articulation (stop and fricative) and two voicing contrasts, each of which is found for each of the places of articulation (as classified by the front release) that clicks use.

=== Linguo-glottalic stops ===
In linguo-glottalic stops, the rear articulation is released into a ejective stop. Although ejective stops are necessarily voiceless, click–ejective contours may be voiced, as the voicing during the articulation of the first (click) release is stopped for the second (ejective) release. In IPA, using the alveolar series as an example, the two series are ⟨ǃ͡qʼ⟩ and ⟨ᶢǃ͡qʼ⟩ (also ⟨ǃ̬͡qʼ⟩, etc.).

=== Linguo-glottalic affricates ===
The rear articulation may also be released as a fricative. However, because the forward articulation may be considered a stop, these are called affricates rather than fricatives. There are two conventions for writing the frication: the English convention, with an x, and the Afrikaans tradition, with a g. Both are used in the orthographies of Khoisan languages. In Juǀ’hõa, for example, they are written voiceless ǃk ǁk ǀk ǂk and voiced gǃk gǁk gǀk gǂk, and in the old orthography qg’ xg’ cg’ çg’ and dqg’ dxg’ dcg’ dçg’; in Naro, they are (voiceless) qg’ xg’ cg’ tcg’, and in Khoekhoe (Korana), ǃkh’ ǁkh’ ǀkh’ ǂkh’. In the IPA, the two series of linguo-pulmonic affricates may be written ⟨ǃ͡χʼ⟩ and ⟨ᶢǃ͡χʼ⟩ (also ⟨ǃ̬͡χʼ⟩), though with a cluster analysis they would be ⟨ǃq͡χʼ⟩ and ⟨ᶢǃq͡χʼ⟩.

Miller (2011) distinguishes between two kinds of affricates: homorganic, where the rear articulation has the same uvular place in its release as it held during the front release, and heterorganic, where it is either velar or epiglottal. Although no language contrasts these possibilities from homorganic affricates, she holds that they are different enough in sound that considering them to be different consonants is useful. The transcriptions she uses are ⟨ǃ͡kxʼ⟩ or ⟨ᶢǃ͡kxʼ⟩ (velar) and ⟨ǃᵸ⟩ or ⟨ᶢǃˤ⟩ (epiglottal). (It is not clear if the ⟨k⟩ is written because the rear release is actually an affricate, or because it better distinguishes these from the homorganic/uvular case, as in broad transcription ⟨x⟩ may be used for either a velar or a uvular fricative.) In Gǀui, which has a velar release, the fricative is actually lateral, and so may be narrowly transcribed as ⟨ǃ͡k𝼄ʼ⟩ (or ⟨ǃ͡𝼄ʼ⟩).

== See also ==
- Pulmonic-contour click
- Glottalized click
- Nasal click

Place →	Labial					Coronal										Dorsal					Laryngeal			
Manner ↓	Bilabial		Labiodental		Linguolabial		Dental		Alveolar		Postalveolar		Retroflex		Palatal		Velar		Uvular		Pharyngeal/epiglottal		Glottal	
Nasal	m̥	m	ɱ̊	ɱ		n̼	n̪̊	n̪	n̥	n	n̠̊	n̠	ɳ̊	ɳ	ɲ̊	ɲ	ŋ̊	ŋ	ɴ̥	ɴ				
Plosive	p	b	p̪	b̪	t̼	d̼	t̪	d̪	t	d			ʈ	ɖ	c	ɟ	k	ɡ	q	ɢ	ʡ		ʔ	
Sibilant affricate							t̪s̪	d̪z̪	ts	dz	t̠ʃ	d̠ʒ	tʂ	dʐ	tɕ	dʑ								
Non-sibilant affricate	pɸ	bβ	p̪f	b̪v			t̪θ	d̪ð	tɹ̝̊	dɹ̝	t̠ɹ̠̊˔	d̠ɹ̠˔			cç	ɟʝ	kx	ɡɣ	qχ	ɢʁ	ʡʜ	ʡʢ	ʔh	
Sibilant fricative							s̪	z̪	s	z	ʃ	ʒ	ʂ	ʐ	ɕ	ʑ								
Non-sibilant fricative	ɸ	β	f	v	θ̼	ð̼	θ	ð	θ̠	ð̠	ɹ̠̊˔	ɹ̠˔	ɻ̊˔	ɻ˔	ç	ʝ	x	ɣ	χ	ʁ	ħ	ʕ	h	ɦ
Approximant		β̞		ʋ				ð̞		ɹ		ɹ̠		ɻ		j		ɰ						˷
Tap/flap		ⱱ̟		ⱱ		ɾ̼			ɾ̥	ɾ			ɽ̊	ɽ						ɢ̆		ʡ̮		
Trill	ʙ̥	ʙ							r̥	r		r̠	ɽ̊r̥	ɽr					ʀ̥	ʀ	ʜ	ʢ		
Lateral affricate									tɬ	dɮ			tꞎ	d𝼅	c𝼆	ɟʎ̝	k𝼄	ɡʟ̝						
Lateral fricative							ɬ̪		ɬ	ɮ			ꞎ	𝼅	𝼆	ʎ̝	𝼄	ʟ̝						
Lateral approximant								l̪	l̥	l		l̠	ɭ̊	ɭ	ʎ̥	ʎ	ʟ̥	ʟ		ʟ̠				
Lateral tap/flap									ɺ̥	ɺ			𝼈̊	𝼈		ʎ̮		ʟ̆						

		BL	LD	D	A	PA	RF	P	V	U
Implosive	Voiced	ɓ			ɗ		ᶑ	ʄ	ɠ	ʛ
Implosive	Voiceless	ɓ̥			ɗ̥		ᶑ̊	ʄ̊	ɠ̊	ʛ̥
Ejective	Stop	pʼ			tʼ		ʈʼ	cʼ	kʼ	qʼ
Ejective	Affricate		p̪fʼ	t̪θʼ	tsʼ	t̠ʃʼ	tʂʼ	tɕʼ	kxʼ	qχʼ
Ejective	Fricative	ɸʼ	fʼ	θʼ	sʼ	ʃʼ	ʂʼ	ɕʼ	xʼ	χʼ
Ejective	Lateral affricate				tɬʼ			c𝼆ʼ	k𝼄ʼ	q𝼄ʼ
Ejective	Lateral fricative				ɬʼ					
Click (top: velar; bottom: uvular)	Tenuis	kʘ qʘ		kǀ qǀ	kǃ qǃ		k𝼊 q𝼊	kǂ qǂ		
Click (top: velar; bottom: uvular)	Voiced	ɡʘ ɢʘ		ɡǀ ɢǀ	ɡǃ ɢǃ		ɡ𝼊 ɢ𝼊	ɡǂ ɢǂ		
Click (top: velar; bottom: uvular)	Nasal	ŋʘ ɴʘ		ŋǀ ɴǀ	ŋǃ ɴǃ		ŋ𝼊 ɴ𝼊	ŋǂ ɴǂ	ʞ	
Click (top: velar; bottom: uvular)	Tenuis lateral				kǁ qǁ					
Click (top: velar; bottom: uvular)	Voiced lateral				ɡǁ ɢǁ					
Click (top: velar; bottom: uvular)	Nasal lateral				ŋǁ ɴǁ					
