= Nǁng language =

Endangered Tuu language of South Africa

Nǁng
- ǂKhomani
- Native to: South Africa
- Region: historically north of the Orange River, between the Namibian border and the Vaal, as well as near the Molopo River by the southernmost point of Botswana
- Ethnicity: 500 Nǁnǂe (ǂKhomani)
- Native speakers: 1 (2025)
- Language family: Tuu: ǃKwi; Ghaap-Khalahari; Nǁng
- Dialects: Western (Nǀuu); Eastern (Langebergen, ǁʼAu)
- Writing system: Latin script

Language codes
- ISO 639-3: ngh
- Glottolog: nngg1234
- ELP: N||ng

Nǁng ([ᵑǁŋ]) or Nǁŋǃke is an almost extinct Tuu language spoken in South Africa. It is commonly known by the ambiguous name of its only spoken dialect Nǀuu (Nǀhuki); the ǀʼAuni name for the Nǀuu, ǂKhomani, is used by the South African government. Nǁng had been thought extinct and was no longer spoken on a daily basis when rediscovered in the 1990s, as the two dozen elderly speakers lived in different villages and the younger generations had shifted to the Khoekhoe language. As of October 2025, all but one of the remaining fluent speakers of the Nǀuu dialect had died, their descendants having shifted to Khoekhoe and Afrikaans. The last living native speaker of N|uu, Katrina Esau, has been teaching it since 2002, albeit with limited means.

== Classification and name ==
Nǁng belongs to the Tuu (Taa–ǃKwi) language family, with extinct ǂUngkue being its closest relative and Taa its closest (and only) living relative.

The two recent dialects are a western/northwestern one, to which the name Nǀuu (Nǀhuki) is sometimes restricted, and an eastern dialect from the area of Langeberg, ǁʼAu. As of 2010, most remaining speakers spoke Nǀuu dialect, and this was the name Nǁng appeared under when it was rediscovered. However, two spoke the ǁʼAu dialect and rejected the label 'Nǀuu'.

The easiest of the various names for English speakers to pronounce is Nǀuu. The letter that looks like a vertical bar (sometimes substituted with a slash) represents a dental click like the English interjection tsk! tsk! (tut! tut!) used to express pity or shame, but nasalized; "Nǀuu" is pronounced like noo, with a tsk! in the middle of the [n]. The double-vertical-bar in "Nǁng" is a (single) lateral click, pronounced like the tchick! used to spur on a horse; the name is pronounced like the ng of sung with this click in it.

The word nǀuu /ᵑǀùú/ is actually a verb, 'to speak a Bushman language', possibly from Khoekhoe. Nǀhuki is a deverbal, 'a Bushman language'. The people call themselves Nǁŋ-ǂe /ᵑǁŋ̀ŋ̀ ǂé/ 'Nǁng people', and Westphal believes this may be the term recorded by Bleek and variously rendered in the literature as ǁNg ǃʼe, ǁn-ǃke, ǁŋ.ǃke. (Note: Distinguish Nǀhuǁéi, which is a variety of Taa, and ǁŨǁʼe, which is related to Seroa.)

The name Nǀusan is an ambiguous Khoekhoe exonym, and is used for several Tuu languages. Traill says that the ǀʼAuni call their language Nǀhuki, but others have recorded their name for their language as ǀʼAuo, and both Westphal and Köhler state that Nǀhuki (Nǀhuci, nǀɦuki) is a variety of Nǁng. It is possible the languages have gotten mixed up in the literature.

== Doculects ==
Güldemann (2017) lists the following pre-democracy doculects as being Nǁng.

Label	Researcher	Date	Notes
ǁŋ	D. Bleek	(notes)	= Langeberg. Bleek label SII.
ǂkhomani	Doke	1937	= Nǀuu. Bleek label SIIa.
Nǀhuki	Westphal	(notes)	= Nǀuu.

== History ==
Nǁng prospered through the 19th century, but encroaching non-ǃKwi languages and acculturation threatened it, like most other Khoisan languages. The language was mainly displaced by Afrikaans and Nama, especially after speakers started migrating to towns in the 1930s and found themselves surrounded by non-Nǁng-speaking people. In 1973 their language was declared extinct, and the remaining Nǁnǂe ("ǂKhomani") were evicted from the Kalahari Gemsbok National Park.

In the 1990s, linguists located 101-year-old Elsie Vaalbooi, who could still speak Nǁng. Anthony Traill interviewed her in 1997. The South African San Institute soon became involved in the pursuit of information on the Nǁng language, and with the help of Vaalbooi they tracked down 25 other people scattered by the eviction who were able to speak or at least understand the language. Thabo Mbeki handed over 400 km^{2} of land to the Nǁnǂe in 1999, and 250 km^{2} of land within the park in 2002. Vaalbooi came up with the Nǁng motto of Sa ǁʼa ǃainsi uinsi "We move towards a better life" for her rehabilitated people. This was also adopted as the official motto for the Northern Cape Province. At the time there were twenty elderly speakers, eight of whom lived in the Western Cape province signed over to them. As of 2007, fewer than ten were still alive in South Africa, and a few more in Botswana; none live with another speaker, and their daily languages are Khoekhoe and Tswana, respectively. In 2013 there were three speakers in the Upington area and two in Olifantshoek (ǁʼAu), speaking the western and eastern dialects, respectively. The younger generations of ǂKhomani are proud Nama speakers and have little affinity to Nǁng.

Recent research on Nǁng led by Amanda Miller of Cornell University has helped describe the physics of its clicks, leading to a better understanding of click sounds in general.

Efforts to perpetuate the Nǁng language continued in 2017 and in 2021. The first Nǁng children's book, !Qhoi n|a Tjhoi (Tortoise and Ostrich), was written by Katrina Esau, one of the two surviving speakers at the time, in May 2021. In June 2021, her brother Simon Sauls died, leaving 88-year-old Katrina Esau as the last speaker of the language. Esau had opened a school with her granddaughter to teach the language to children, but it was vandalized during the COVID pandemic and abandoned. As of October 2025, aged 92, Esau still teaches the language.

== Phonology ==
Nǁng has one of the more complex sound inventories of the world's languages. Most lexical words consist of a phonological foot with two moras (tone-bearing units). The first mora must start with a consonant (CV). The second mora may be a single vowel (V), a nasal consonant m or n (N), or one of a drastically reduced number of consonants plus a vowel (cV). That is, lexical roots, not counting sometimes lexicalized CV prefixes and suffixes, are typically CVcV, CVV, CVN, though there are also a few which are CV, as well as longer words of two phonological feet: CVCV, where the second C is not one of the reduced set of consonants but cannot be a click, (Note: The most common consonants in this position are /ʔ/, /c/ (/c̟/), and /k/.) CVCVN, CVVCV, CVNCV, CVVCVN, CVNCVN, CVcVCV, CVVCVcV. Grammatical words tend to be CV or V.

There are occasional exceptions to these patterns in ideophonic words such as /ɟùɾùkúɟúí-sí/ 'Namaqua sandgrouse' (CVcVCVCVV + suffix) and historically reduplicated words with clicks such as /ǁáḿǁàm̀/ 'to talk'.

=== Vowels ===
Like most languages in southern Africa, Nǁng has five vowel qualities. These may occur strident and nasalized. A word may have two adjacent vowels, which resemble a long vowel or diphthong.

The strident vowels are thought to have the phonation called harsh voice. They are strongly pharyngealized, and for some speakers involve low-frequency trilling that presumably involves the aryepiglottic fold. The four strident vowel qualities (there is no strident i) are rather different from the non-strident vowels, as is common when a vowel is pharyngealized.

	High front	Mid front	Low central	Mid back	High back/central
Modal	i [i̞]	e [e̞]	a [ä]	o [o̞]	u [u̽]
Nasal	ĩ [ĩ̞]	ẽ [ẽ̞]	ã [ä̃]	õ [õ̞]	ũ [u̽̃]
Strident (Note: These are often written with a superscript ⟨ʢ⟩.)		e𐞴 [ɛ̰̰]	a𐞴 [ɑ̟̰̰]	o𐞴 [ɔ̟̰̰]	u𐞴 [ɵ̰̰]
Nasal strident		(?)	ã𐞴 [ɑ̟̰̰̃]	õ𐞴 [ɔ̟̰̰̃]	ũ𐞴 [ɵ̰̰̃]

Nǁng is the only Khoisan language known to have a strident front vowel, /e𐞴/, though this is rare, occurring in only two known words, zeqe /zḛ̰́é/ 'to fly' and ǂʻheqbe /ᵑ̊ǂḛ̰̀βé/ 'man's loincloth'. The lack of a nasalized equivalent is thought to be an accidental gap or simply unattested due to the small number of known words.

The tone-bearing segment may be a syllabic nasal, /ŋ̍/, rather than a vowel, as in the name Nǁng.

Only certain sequences of vowels may occur in a bimoraic foot, regardless of whether there is an intervening consonant. (That is, the permitted vowels are the same whether a word is CVcV or CVV.) If the first vowel is any variety (nasal, strident, etc.) of /i, e, ŋ̍/, then the second vowel must be identical. If the first vowel is /a/, then the second may be anything but /ŋ̍/. If the first vowel is /o/ or /u/, then the second may be either /a/ or a vowel of the same height: that is, oa, oo, oe; ua, uu, ui. The vowels must be both oral or both nasal; nasal vowels cannot follow a nasal stop (though they may follow nasal clicks). Only the first vowel may be strident.

Front vowels can only follow the click types ǀ and ǂ (the back-vowel constraint), with a single known exception, [ᵑǁˀé] 'to go'. Front vowels and strident vowels may also not follow [χ], whether an affricate release or a fricative, with the exception of three female kin terms where the second syllable is /χè/. As with the lack of strident front vowels, there are thus a small number of exceptions for these constraints with /e/, but none with /i/.

=== Tones ===
Nǁng moras may carry a high or low tone, /H/ or /L/. A typical lexical word consists of two moras, and so may have a high (HH), low (LL), rising (LH), or falling (HL) tone.

Monomoraic lexical roots, such as /cú/ 'mouth', are high- rather than low-tone by a 5–1 margin. CVV and CVN roots are HH, HL, and LH with about equal frequency, with LL slightly less common. However, half of all CVcV roots are LH, making it markedly frequent, while only 5% are HL. In an additional CV foot the distribution of H and L is approximately equal; an additional CVN or CVcV foot may pattern like an initial foot, but they are too infrequent to be sure.

=== Consonants ===
The majority of Nǁng consonants are clicks. It was once thought that Khoisan languages distinguish velar and uvular clicks, but recent research into Nǁng, and reevaluation of the data on ǃXóõ, indicates that, for these languages at least, the distinction is one of pure clicks versus click–plosive contours.

Initial pulmonic consonants (C1)
		Bilabial	Laminal alveolar	Pre- palatal	Velar	Uvular	Glottal
Nasal		m	(n)	ɲ̟			
Plosive	aspirated	pʰ		c̟ʰ	kʰ		
Plosive	voiceless	p		c̟	k		ʔ
Plosive	voiced	b		ɟ̟	ɡ		
Affricate	voiceless	pf	ts	c̟χ			
Fricative	voiceless		s			χ	h
Fricative	voiced		z				

"(?)" marks possible accidental gaps; these consonants might be expected based on their occurrence in neighboring languages with similar phonologies, but are expected to be rare, and may occur in Nǁng words that have not been recorded.

What were historically initial alveolar occlusives have become pre-palatal in lexical words. Among grammatical words in the western dialect there is a single exception, ná 'I'; in the eastern dialect even that has merged, for ɲá 'I'.

Reduced medial consonants (C2)
	Bilabial	Alveolar
Nasal	m	n
Oral (median)	β	ɾ
Lateral		l

Only sonorants may occur as the medial consonant of a phonological foot. /l/ is only known from three words. The oral sonorants do not occur in initial position.

Glottalic consonants (C1)
	Bilabial	Laminal alveolar	Pre- palatal	Velar
Plosive	pʼ		cʼ	kʼ
Affricate		t͡sʼ		k͡χʼ

Lingual consonants (C1)
		Labio- uvular	Denti- pharyngeal	Alveo- uvular		Palato- pharyngeal
		Labio- uvular	Denti- pharyngeal	median	lateral	Palato- pharyngeal
Nasal	voiced	ᵑʘ	ᵑǀ	ᵑǃ	ᵑǁ	ᵑǂ
Nasal	glottalized	ᵑʘˀ	ᵑǀˀ	ᵑǃˀ	ᵑǁˀ	ᵑǂˀ
Nasal	aspirated	(?)	ᵑ̊ǀʰ	ᵑ̊ǃʰ	ᵑ̊ǁʰ	ᵑ̊ǂʰ
Plosive	voiced	ᶢʘ	ᶢǀ	ᶢǃ	ᶢǁ	ᶢǂ
Plosive	tenuis	ᵏʘ	ᵏǀ	ᵏǃ	ᵏǁ	ᵏǂ
Plosive	aspirated	(?)	ᵏǀʰ	ᵏǃʰ	ᵏǁʰ	ᵏǂʰ

These are simple clicks. The traditional term "velaric" is something of a misnomer, for the rear articulation is further back than the velum, and indeed further back than Nǁng /q/. Miller et al. prefer the term "lingual" for this airstream mechanism; they also reject the existence of click "accompaniments", using the IPA symbols to represent both points of articulation rather than solely the anterior articulation. Besides being motivated phonetically, this has the benefit of better illustrating the parallels between clicks and pulmonic consonants.

In the above rubric, the first element of the name is the forward articulation, and the second is the rear articulation.

Linguo-pulmonic consonants
		Labio- uvular	Denti- pharyngeal	Alveo-uvular		Palato- pharyngeal
		Labio- uvular	Denti- pharyngeal	central	lateral	Palato- pharyngeal
Plosive	tenuis	ʘ͡q	ǀ͡q	ǃ͡q	ǁ͡q	ǂ͡q
Plosive	aspirated	(?)	ǀ͡qʰ	ǃ͡qʰ	ǁ͡qʰ	ǂ͡qʰ
Plosive	voiced	(?)	ǀ͡ɢ	(?)	(?)	(?)
Affricate		ʘ͡qχ	ǀ͡qχ	ǃ͡qχ	ǁ͡qχ	ǂ͡qχ

These are airstream contour consonants, which start off with a lingual (velaric) airstream mechanism and finish with a pulmonic airstream (whereas affricates are manner contour consonants, starting as plosives and finishing as fricatives). Traditionally, these were considered to be uvular clicks, because the uvular or pharyngeal closure is audible, but in fact the rear closure of all Nǁng clicks is uvular or pharyngeal. (The distinction between uvular and pharyngeal is not represented here.) Effectively, in these clicks the release of the rear articulation is delayed, so that there is a double release burst, the forward (lingual) release followed by the rear (pulmonic) release.

Linguo-glottalic consonants
	Labio- uvular	Denti- pharyngeal	Alveo-uvular		Palato- pharyngeal
	Labio- uvular	Denti- pharyngeal	central	lateral	Palato- pharyngeal
Plosive	ʘ͡qʼ	ǀ͡qʼ	ǃ͡qʼ	ǁ͡qʼ	ǂ͡qʼ
Affricate	(?)	ǀ͡χʼ	ǃ͡χʼ	ǁ͡χʼ	ǂ͡χʼ

These differ from the previous consonants in that the second, rear release is an ejective.
