= NTBC =

NTBC may stand for:

- National Technology Business Centre, a Zambia government agency
- Nitisinone, a chemical drug
