= Una Rooi =

One of the last speakers of the Nllng language

Katriena ǀUna Kassie Rooi was one of the last eight speakers of Nǀuu language, also known as Nǀhuki, ǂKhomani, South Africa's last original Bushman language. Ouma ǀUna Rooi, or Kaitjie, as she was affectionately known, was born in 1930 at Tweerivieren (ǂakaǂnous), in what is now the Kgalagadi Transfrontier Park which straddles the boundary between South Africa and Botswana. She died on 3 March 2012. ǀUna was the fourth child of ǀKhuka and Ari Kassie. ǀUna, her San name, refers to the soft powder puff, made from the ear of a bat-eared fox. The ǀuna is used to spread buchu powder on new born babies, which is traditionally carried in a purse made from the shell of a geometric tortoise.

Aged five, she was taken to Johannesburg as part of the 'Bushman' display at the British Empire Exhibition. At this time she was separated from her parents and raised by her grandparents. ǂHan Kassie, her grandfather, featured prominently in the photographs of the Empire Exhibition. Her time with her grandparents helped deepen her knowledge of traditional mythology and beliefs of the Nǁnǂe culture and language, which were in the process of dying out. She later travelled to Durban and Cape Town. Her people lost their land and all their possessions in 1937 and lived for decades in poverty and obscurity.

Sociolinguist Nigel Crawhall met Rooi in the township of Swartkop, outside Upington in the Northern Cape in 1997. He records that "she and her sisters provided key evidence to help the ǂKhomani (Nǁnǂe) people regain a small portion of their land through a land claim." Rooi provided important information on sites within the Kgalagadi Transfrontier Park, including the names of rivers, pans and gravesites that provided evidence of original occupation.

Crawhall also recalls that: "When the ǂKhomani people made their first book about their culture and heritage, Enter the Light, we asked Ouma |Una to give the book a title that summarised their experience of freedom, oppression, dispossession, violence, poverty, democracy and restitution. Ouma ǀUna was not one to nurse a grudge, her heart always sought peace and reconciliation. She called the book after a Nǀuu saying: i hunike xu a ǁga, i ke hunike ǀʼe a qǃuruke (We all came out of that darkness, and we together enter into the light)."

On language death, Rooi observed: "If a person who speaks our language dies then our language also dies. When you cover him with sand the language is not like a plant that grows again."
