= Gǁana language =

Khoe dialect cluster of Botswana

Gǁana
- Native to: Botswana
- Ethnicity: Gǁana
- Native speakers: 2,500 (2013)
- Language family: Khoe–Kwadi: Khoe; Kalahari (Tshu–Khwe); West; Gǁana

Language codes
- ISO 639-3: Either: gnk – Gǁana gwj – Gǀwi
- Glottolog: anaa1239
- ELP: ||Gana

- ||Gana [sic] is classified as Vulnerable by the UNESCO Atlas of the World's Languages in Danger

Gǁana (pronounced /ˈɡɑːnə/ GAH-nə in English, and also spelled ǁGana, ǁ᪶Ana, Gxana, Dxana, Xgana) is a Khoe language and dialect cluster of Botswana. It is closely related to Naro, and includes the well-known dialect Gǀwi, which has the majority of speakers.

The double pipe at the beginning of the name "Gǁana" represents a click like the English interjection used when saying giddy-ap to a horse. For the clicks and other sounds found in Gǁana, see Gǀwi dialect.

== Dialects ==
- Gǀwi
- Domkhoe
- Gǁaa(khwe)
- Kǀhessákhoe

== Sources ==
- Brenzinger, Matthias (2011) "The twelve modern Khoisan languages." In Witzlack-Makarevich & Ernszt (eds.), Khoisan languages and linguistics: proceedings of the 3rd International Symposium, Riezlern / Kleinwalsertal (Research in Khoisan Studies 29). Cologne: Rüdiger Köppe Verlag.
