= National Technology Business Centre =

- Mission: To be a leading institution in the promotion, marketing and transfer of technologies in Zambia by the year 2030

Agency overview
- Formed: April 1, 2002
- Headquarters: Lusaka, Zambia
- Employees: 22
- Agency executive: Dr. Chitundu Kasase Ph.D, Director
- Website: www.ntbc.co.zm

The National Technology Business Centre (NTBC) is a Zambia government agency that supports the commercialization and transfer of technology. NTBC's primary objective is to link developed and proven technologies from various local and international sources with local technology seekers, i.e. business community and entrepreneurs, for the creation of wealth and employment.

== History ==
NTBC was created by the Science and Technology Act No. 26 of 1997 and Statutory Instrument No. 136 of 1999 to promote, market and facilitate technology transfer. It became operational on April 1, 2002, under Zambia's Ministry of Technology and Science.

== Services ==
Though NTBC is a government entity, it takes on the role of a consultancy in the areas of technology commercialization and promoting businesses development through the utilization of expired patents.

=== Business Development ===
Promoting technology business through business incubation and the Business Development fund.

=== Technology Transfer ===
Bringing technology seekers and users together to improve quality production of goods and service.

=== Commercialization of Innovative Local Products ===
Aiding idea conceptualizing, facilitating product development/improvement, testing, production, licensing, launch and marketing

=== Technology Audit and Validation ===
It is NTBC's responsibility to take stock of the current technologies in use in Zambia, both local and foreign, and to validate their performance along with the other relevant government bodies.

=== Technology Information Resource Centre ===
An online repository of subscriptions and other resources is provided to innovators, research institutions and the business community.

=== Advise on Intellectual Property Protection & Utilization ===
NTBC works with WIPO and the Patents and Companies Registration Agency (PACRA) to add value to Zambian products and innovations.

== IDDS ==
NTBC is one of the partner organizations hosting International Development Design Summit (IDDS) 2013 in Zambia.
