= Bilabial click =

Consonantal sound

Bilabial click type

ʘ ɋ
- IPA number: 176

Audio sample
- source · help

Encoding
- Entity (decimal): &#664;
- Unicode (hex): U+0298
- X-SAMPA: O\
- Braille: ⠯ (braille pattern dots-12346) ⠏ (braille pattern dots-1234)
Image

Tenuis labial click (velar)

kʘ kɋ

ᵏʘ ᵏɋ

ʘ ɋ

Voiced labial click (velar)

ɡʘ ɡɋ

ᶢʘ ᶢɋ

ᵇʘ

ʘ̬ ɋ̬

Encoding
- X-SAMPA: O\_v

Nasal labial click (velar)

ŋʘ ŋɋ

ᵑʘ ᵑɋ

ᵐʘ

ʘ̃ ɋ̃

Encoding
- X-SAMPA: O\_~

Tenuis labial click (uvular)

qʘ qɋ

𐞥ʘ 𐞥ɋ

Voiced labial click (uvular)

ɢʘ ɢɋ

𐞒ʘ 𐞒ɋ

Nasal labial click (uvular)

ɴʘ ɴɋ

ᶰʘ ᶰɋ

The bilabial clicks are a family of click consonants that sound like a smack of the lips. They are found as phonemes only in the small Tuu language family (currently two languages, one down to its last speaker), in the ǂ’Amkoe language of Botswana (also moribund), and in the extinct Damin ritual language of Australia. However, bilabial clicks are found paralinguistically for a kiss in various languages, including integrated into a greeting in the Hadza language of Tanzania, and as allophones of labial–velar stops in some West African languages (Ladefoged 1968), as of /mw/ in some of the languages neighboring Shona, such as Ndau and Tonga.

The symbol in the International Phonetic Alphabet that represents the place of articulation of these sounds is ⟨ʘ⟩ (sometimes called bullseye). An uncommon old-style para-IPA letter for bilabial clicks is a turned b with a hook, ⟨ɋ ⟩. Either letter may be combined with a second letter or a diacritic to indicate voicing and the manner of articulation, though this is commonly omitted for tenuis clicks.

== Bilabial click consonants and their transcription ==
In official IPA transcription, the click letter is combined with a ⟨k ɡ ŋ q ɢ ɴ⟩ via a tie bar, though ⟨k⟩ is frequently omitted. Many authors instead use a superscript ⟨k ɡ ŋ q ɢ ɴ⟩ without the tie bar, again often neglecting the ⟨k⟩. Either letter, whether baseline or superscript, is usually placed before the click letter, but may come after when the release of the velar or uvular occlusion is audible. A third convention is the click letter with diacritics for voicelessness, voicing and nasalization; this would require something like the guttural diacritic ◌̴ to distinguish uvular–labial clicks. Common labial clicks in these three transcriptions are:

Trans. I	Trans. II	Trans. III	Description
(velar)
⟨k͜ʘ⟩	⟨ᵏʘ⟩	⟨ʘ⟩	tenuis bilabial click
⟨k͜ʘʰ⟩	⟨ᵏʘʰ⟩	⟨ʘʰ⟩	aspirated bilabial click
⟨ɡ͜ʘ⟩	⟨ᶢʘ⟩	⟨ʘ̬⟩	voiced bilabial click
⟨ŋ͜ʘ⟩	⟨ᵑʘ⟩	⟨ʘ̬̃⟩	bilabial nasal click
⟨ŋ̊͜ʘʰʰ⟩	⟨ᵑ̊ʘʰʰ⟩	⟨ʘ̥̃ʰʰ⟩	aspirated bilabial nasal click
⟨ŋ͜ʘˀ⟩	⟨ᵑʘˀ⟩	⟨ʘ̃ˀ⟩	glottalized bilabial nasal click
(uvular)
⟨q͜ʘ⟩	⟨𐞥ʘ⟩	⟨ʘ̴⟩	tenuis bilabial click
⟨q͜ʘʰ⟩	⟨𐞥ʘʰ⟩	⟨ʘ̴ʰ⟩	aspirated bilabial click
⟨ɢ͜ʘ⟩	⟨𐞒ʘ⟩	⟨ʘ̴̬⟩	voiced bilabial click
⟨ɴ͜ʘ⟩	⟨ᶰʘ⟩	⟨ʘ̴̬̃⟩	bilabial nasal click
⟨ɴ̥͜ʘʰʰ⟩	⟨ᶰ̥ʘʰʰ⟩	⟨ʘ̴̥̃ʰʰ⟩	aspirated bilabial nasal click
⟨ɴ͜ʘˀ⟩	⟨ᶰʘˀ⟩	⟨ʘ̴̃ˀ⟩	glottalized bilabial nasal click

The last is what is heard in the sound sample at right, as non-native speakers tend to glottalize clicks to avoid nasalizing them.

Damin also had an egressive bilabial [ʘ↑], which may be an egressive click (if it is not buccal) and which is always followed by another consonant ([ɲ], [ŋ] or [pj]).

== Features ==
Features of ingressive labial clicks:

- The basic articulation may be voiced, nasal, aspirated, glottalized, etc.
- The forward place of articulation is labial, which means it is articulated with the lips. The release is a noisy, affricate-like sound. Bilabial articulation, using both lips, is typical. Sometimes this may pass through a labio-dental stage as the click is released, making it noisier. In other cases, the lower lip may start out in contact with both the upper teeth and the upper lip.
- Clicks may be oral or nasal, which means that the airflow is either restricted to the mouth, or passes through the nose as well.
- Because the sound is not produced with airflow over the tongue, the median–lateral dichotomy does not apply.
- The airstream mechanism is lingual ingressive (also known as velaric ingressive), which means a pocket of air trapped between two closures is rarefied by a "sucking" action of the tongue, rather than being moved by the glottis or the lungs/diaphragm. The release of the forward closure produces the "click" sound. Voiced and nasal clicks have a simultaneous pulmonic egressive airstream. (One of the two labial clicks in Damin is lingual egressive, which means that the trapped air pocket is compressed by the tongue until it is allowed to spurt out through the lips.)

The labial clicks are sometimes erroneously described as sounding like a kiss. However, they do not have the pursed lips of a kiss. Instead, the lips are compressed, more like a [p] than a [w], and they sound more like a noisy smack of the lips than a kiss.

== Symbol ==
The bullseye or bull's eye (ʘ) symbol used in phonetic transcription of the phoneme was made an official part of the International Phonetic Alphabet in 1979, but had existed for at least 50 years earlier. It is encoded in Unicode as U+0298 ʘ LATIN LETTER BILABIAL CLICK. The superscript IPA version is U+107B5 𐞵 MODIFIER LETTER BILABIAL CLICK.

Similar graphemes consisting of a circled dot encoded by Unicode are:

- Gothic 𐍈, hwair
- astronomical symbol ☉ "Sun"
- mathematical operators U+2299 ⊙ CIRCLED DOT OPERATOR and U+2A00 ⨀ N-ARY CIRCLED DOT OPERATOR
- geometrical symbol U+25C9 ◉ FISHEYE
- Cyrillic Ꙩ, ꙩ (monocular O)

The para-IPA letter ⟨ɋ⟩ is covered by U+024B ɋ LATIN SMALL LETTER Q WITH HOOK TAIL.

== Occurrence ==
English does not have a labial click (or any click consonant, for that matter) as a phoneme, but a plain bilabial click does occur in mimesis, as a lip-smacking sound children use to imitate a fish.

Labial clicks only occur in the Tuu and Kxʼa families of southern Africa, and in the Australian ritual language Damin.

Language	Word	IPA	Meaning
ǂʼAmkoe (ǂHoan)	ʘoa		'two'
Damin	mǃi	[ᵑʘi] = [ʘ̃i]	'vegetable'
Taa (ǃXóõ)	ʘàa		'child'
Nǁng (Nǀuu)	ʘũu		'son'

== Origins ==
Labial clicks may have arisen historically from labialization of other places of articulation. Starostin (2003) notes that the ǂ’Amkoe words for 'one' and 'two', /ʘ̃ũ/ and /ʘoa/, have labial clicks whereas no other Khoisan language has a labial consonant of any kind in its words for these numerals, and Starostin (2007) and Sands reconstruct a series of labialized clicks in Proto-Kxʼa, which became labial clicks in ǂ’Amkoe. In Hadza, the word for 'kiss', /ǀ̃ua/, becomes a mimetic /ǀ̃ʷa/ or /ʘ̃ʷa/ in greetings.

== See also ==
- Alveolar click
- Dental click
- Lateral click
- Palatal click
- Retroflex click
- List of phonetics topics

== Notes ==
Place →	Labial					Coronal										Dorsal					Laryngeal			
Manner ↓	Bilabial		Labiodental		Linguolabial		Dental		Alveolar		Postalveolar		Retroflex		(Alveolo-)palatal		Velar		Uvular		Pharyngeal/epiglottal		Glottal	
Nasal	m̥	m	ɱ̊	ɱ		n̼	n̪̊	n̪	n̥	n	n̠̊	n̠	ɳ̊	ɳ	ɲ̊	ɲ	ŋ̊	ŋ	ɴ̥	ɴ				
Plosive	p	b	p̪	b̪	t̼	d̼	t̪	d̪	t	d			ʈ	ɖ	c	ɟ	k	ɡ	q	ɢ	ʡ		ʔ	
Sibilant affricate							t̪s̪	d̪z̪	ts	dz	t̠ʃ	d̠ʒ	tʂ	dʐ	tɕ	dʑ								
Non-sibilant affricate	pɸ	bβ	p̪f	b̪v			t̪θ	d̪ð	tɹ̝̊	dɹ̝	t̠ɹ̠̊˔	d̠ɹ̠˔			cç	ɟʝ	kx	ɡɣ	qχ	ɢʁ	ʡʜ	ʡʢ	ʔh	
Sibilant fricative							s̪	z̪	s	z	ʃ	ʒ	ʂ	ʐ	ɕ	ʑ								
Non-sibilant fricative	ɸ	β	f	v	θ̼	ð̼	θ	ð	θ̠	ð̠	ɹ̠̊˔	ɹ̠˔	ɻ̊˔	ɻ˔	ç	ʝ	x	ɣ	χ	ʁ	ħ	ʕ	h	ɦ
Approximant		β̞		ʋ				ð̞		ɹ		ɹ̠		ɻ		j		ɰ						˷
Tap/flap		ⱱ̟		ⱱ					ɾ̥	ɾ			ɽ̊	ɽ						ɢ̆		ʡ̆		
Trill	ʙ̥	ʙ							r̥	r		r̠	ɽ̊r̥	ɽr					ʀ̥	ʀ	ʜ	ʢ		
Lateral affricate									tɬ	dɮ			tꞎ	d𝼅	c𝼆	ɟʎ̝	k𝼄	ɡʟ̝						
Lateral fricative							ɬ̪		ɬ	ɮ			ꞎ	𝼅	𝼆	ʎ̝	𝼄	ʟ̝						
Lateral approximant								l̪	l̥	l		l̠	ɭ̊	ɭ	ʎ̥	ʎ	ʟ̥	ʟ		ʟ̠				
Lateral tap/flap									ɺ̥	ɺ			𝼈̊	𝼈		ʎ̆		ʟ̆						

		BL	LD	D	A	PA	RF	P	V	U
Implosive	Voiced	ɓ			ɗ		ᶑ	ʄ	ɠ	ʛ
Implosive	Voiceless	ɓ̥			ɗ̥		ᶑ̊	ʄ̊	ɠ̊	ʛ̥
Ejective	Stop	pʼ			tʼ		ʈʼ	cʼ	kʼ	qʼ
Ejective	Affricate		p̪fʼ	tθʼ	tsʼ	tʃʼ	tʂʼ	tɕʼ	kxʼ	qχʼ
Ejective	Fricative	ɸʼ	fʼ	θʼ	sʼ	ʃʼ	ʂʼ	ɕʼ	xʼ	χʼ
Ejective	Lateral affricate				tɬʼ			c𝼆ʼ	k𝼄ʼ	q𝼄ʼ
Ejective	Lateral fricative				ɬʼ					
Click (top: velar; bottom: uvular)	Tenuis	kʘ qʘ		kǀ qǀ	kǃ qǃ		k𝼊 q𝼊	kǂ qǂ		
Click (top: velar; bottom: uvular)	Voiced	ɡʘ ɢʘ		ɡǀ ɢǀ	ɡǃ ɢǃ		ɡ𝼊 ɢ𝼊	ɡǂ ɢǂ		
Click (top: velar; bottom: uvular)	Nasal	ŋʘ ɴʘ		ŋǀ ɴǀ	ŋǃ ɴǃ		ŋ𝼊 ɴ𝼊	ŋǂ ɴǂ	ʞ	
Click (top: velar; bottom: uvular)	Tenuis lateral				kǁ qǁ					
Click (top: velar; bottom: uvular)	Voiced lateral				ɡǁ ɢǁ					
Click (top: velar; bottom: uvular)	Nasal lateral				ŋǁ ɴǁ					
