= Dutlwe =

- Village
- Location in Botswana
- Coordinates: 23°58′54″S 23°55′37″E
- Country: Botswana
- District: Kweneng District
- Constituency: Takatokwane

Government
  - Village Chief: Motshegetsi Puleng

Population (2022)
  - Total: 1,464
- Time zone: Central Africa Time

Dutlwe is a village in Kweneng District of Botswana composed of people from the Bakgalagadi (tn) and Basarwa tribes. The population of Dutlwe was 1,464 with 692 males and 772 females in the 2022 census. As part of IDDS Botswana 2018, a bean thresher was installed in the village due to bean farming beaning one of the villages main sources of income. The village chief, Motshegetsi Puleng, was arrested for stabbing his girlfriend on July 4, 2020. In November 2022, 2 village residents died after drinking tea that had been suspected to be poisoned. 4 others in the family also went to the hospital, but barely survived. There is a Calvary Baptist church in the town led by Pastor Thokwane.
