= Nasal click =

Consonantal sound

Voiced alveolar nasal click

ŋǃ

ᵑǃ

Audio sample
- source · help

Aspirated dental nasal click

ᵑ̊ǀʰ𐞁

Breathy-voiced lateral nasal click

ᵑǁʱ

ᵑ̤ǁ

Voiceless palatal nasal click

ᵑ̊ǂ

Preglottalized labial nasal click

ˀᵑʘ

Nasal clicks are click consonants pronounced with nasal airflow. All click types (bilabial ʘ, dental ǀ, alveolar ǃ, lateral ǁ, palatal ǂ, and retroflex 𝼊) have nasal variants, and these are attested in four or five phonations: voiced, voiceless, aspirated, murmured (breathy voiced), and—in the analysis of Miller (2011)—glottalized.

== Types of nasal clicks ==
Modally voiced nasal clicks are ubiquitous: They are found in every language which has clicks as part of its regular sound inventory. This includes Damin, which has only nasal clicks, and Dahalo, which has only plain and glottalized nasal clicks. They are fully nasalized throughout, like the pulmonic nasal [m] and [n]. That is, you pronounce a uvular [ɴ] sound (like English ng) with the back of your tongue, and make the click sound in the middle of it using the front of your tongue. They are typically transcribed something like ⟨ᵑǃ⟩; in Khoekhoe, they are written ⟨ǃn ǁn ǀn ǂn⟩, in Juǀʼhõa as ⟨nǃ nǁ nǀ nǂ⟩, and in Zulu, Xhosa, Sandawe, and Naro as ⟨nc nx nq ntc (nç)⟩.

Aspirated nasal clicks, often described as voiceless nasal with delayed aspiration, are widespread in southern Africa, being found in all languages of the Khoe, Tuu, and Kxʼa language families, though they are unattested elsewhere. They are typically transcribed something like ⟨ᵑ̊ǃʰ⟩; in Khoekhoe, they are written ⟨ǃh ǁh ǀh ǂh⟩, and in Juǀʼhõa as ⟨ǃʼh ǁʼh ǀʼh ǂʼh⟩. Initially and in citation form, words with these consonants are pronounced with voiceless nasal airflow throughout the production of the click and in some languages for an extended time afterward; this period of up to 150 ms (the voice onset time) may include weak breathy-voiced aspiration at the end. However, when embedded in a phrase after a vowel they tend to be partially voiced; the preceding vowel will [[also be nasalized or the click prenasalized]], for a realization of [!˭ʰ] vs [ŋ͡nǃ̬ʱ𐞁]. They have a tone-depressor effect, so that a level tone on the following vowel will be realized as rising.

The description above is typical, characteristic of languages such as Khoekhoe and Gǀui. However, aspirated nasal clicks have a more extreme pronunciation in Taa, where they need to maintain a distinction from both the plain voiceless and breathy-voiced nasal clicks. In this language they are not voiced after vowel sounds except in rapid speech, and in addition do not have nasal airflow; Trail reports that they instead have active ingressive pulmonic airflow (that is, air is breathed in the nose rather than being vented out).

Breathy-voiced (murmured) nasal clicks are less common. They are known from !Kung languages such as Juǀʼhoansi, from Taa, and from the Bantu languages Xhosa and Zulu. They are pronounced like modally voiced nasal clicks, but in addition are followed by a period of murmured phonation, and like other breathy-voiced consonants, may have a depressor effect on tone (in Zulu and Xhosa, for example). They are typically transcribed something like ⟨ᵑǃʰ⟩ or ⟨ᵑǃʱ⟩; in Juǀʼhõa, they are written ⟨nǃh nǁh nǀh nǂh⟩, and in Zulu and Xhosa, as ⟨ngc ngx ngq⟩. In IPA, they could be either ⟨ᵑǁʱ⟩ or ⟨ᵑ̈ǁ⟩

Voiceless nasal clicks distinct from voiceless aspirated clicks are only attested from one language, Taa, which changes the voicing of the initial consonant to distinguish singular and plural nouns. In this language, both voiced and voiceless nasal clicks (but not the aspirated and breathy-voiced nasal clicks) nasalize the following vowel; they are largely distinguished by voiceless vs. murmured nasalization leading up to the click release, and the voicelessness occurs even after vowels.

Glottalized nasal clicks are extremely common, but are covered in another article: Glottalized clicks.

There are also preglottalized nasal clicks. These are pronounced like modally voiced nasal clicks, but the click release is preceded by a short period of nasalization that has a glottal-stop onset. They are considered unitary consonants, and not sequences of glottal stop plus nasal click. They are only reported from a few languages: Taa, Ekoka !Kung, and ǂHoan. (Taa also has preglottalized non-click nasals, though Ekoka apparently does not.)

== See also ==
- Glottalized click
- Pulmonic-contour click
- Ejective-contour click

Place →	Labial					Coronal										Dorsal					Laryngeal			
Manner ↓	Bilabial		Labiodental		Linguolabial		Dental		Alveolar		Postalveolar		Retroflex		(Alveolo-)palatal		Velar		Uvular		Pharyngeal/epiglottal		Glottal	
Nasal	m̥	m	ɱ̊	ɱ		n̼	n̪̊	n̪	n̥	n	n̠̊	n̠	ɳ̊	ɳ	ɲ̊	ɲ	ŋ̊	ŋ	ɴ̥	ɴ				
Plosive	p	b	p̪	b̪	t̼	d̼	t̪	d̪	t	d			ʈ	ɖ	c	ɟ	k	ɡ	q	ɢ	ʡ		ʔ	
Sibilant affricate							t̪s̪	d̪z̪	ts	dz	t̠ʃ	d̠ʒ	tʂ	dʐ	tɕ	dʑ								
Non-sibilant affricate	pɸ	bβ	p̪f	b̪v			t̪θ	d̪ð	tɹ̝̊	dɹ̝	t̠ɹ̠̊˔	d̠ɹ̠˔			cç	ɟʝ	kx	ɡɣ	qχ	ɢʁ	ʡʜ	ʡʢ	ʔh	
Sibilant fricative							s̪	z̪	s	z	ʃ	ʒ	ʂ	ʐ	ɕ	ʑ								
Non-sibilant fricative	ɸ	β	f	v	θ̼	ð̼	θ	ð	θ̠	ð̠	ɹ̠̊˔	ɹ̠˔	ɻ̊˔	ɻ˔	ç	ʝ	x	ɣ	χ	ʁ	ħ	ʕ	h	ɦ
Approximant		β̞		ʋ				ð̞		ɹ		ɹ̠		ɻ		j		ɰ						˷
Tap/flap		ⱱ̟		ⱱ					ɾ̥	ɾ			ɽ̊	ɽ						ɢ̆		ʡ̮		
Trill	ʙ̥	ʙ							r̥	r		r̠	ɽ̊r̥	ɽr					ʀ̥	ʀ	ʜ	ʢ		
Lateral affricate									tɬ	dɮ			tꞎ	d𝼅	c𝼆	ɟʎ̝	k𝼄	ɡʟ̝						
Lateral fricative							ɬ̪		ɬ	ɮ			ꞎ	𝼅	𝼆	ʎ̝	𝼄	ʟ̝						
Lateral approximant								l̪	l̥	l		l̠	ɭ̊	ɭ	ʎ̥	ʎ	ʟ̥	ʟ		ʟ̠				
Lateral tap/flap									ɺ̥	ɺ			𝼈̊	𝼈		ʎ̮		ʟ̆						

		BL	LD	D	A	PA	RF	P	V	U
Implosive	Voiced	ɓ			ɗ		ᶑ	ʄ	ɠ	ʛ
Implosive	Voiceless	ɓ̥			ɗ̥		ᶑ̊	ʄ̊	ɠ̊	ʛ̥
Ejective	Stop	pʼ			tʼ		ʈʼ	cʼ	kʼ	qʼ
Ejective	Affricate		p̪fʼ	t̪θʼ	tsʼ	t̠ʃʼ	tʂʼ	tɕʼ	kxʼ	qχʼ
Ejective	Fricative	ɸʼ	fʼ	θʼ	sʼ	ʃʼ	ʂʼ	ɕʼ	xʼ	χʼ
Ejective	Lateral affricate				tɬʼ			c𝼆ʼ	k𝼄ʼ	q𝼄ʼ
Ejective	Lateral fricative				ɬʼ					
Click (top: velar; bottom: uvular)	Tenuis	kʘ qʘ		kǀ qǀ	kǃ qǃ		k𝼊 q𝼊	kǂ qǂ		
Click (top: velar; bottom: uvular)	Voiced	ɡʘ ɢʘ		ɡǀ ɢǀ	ɡǃ ɢǃ		ɡ𝼊 ɢ𝼊	ɡǂ ɢǂ		
Click (top: velar; bottom: uvular)	Nasal	ŋʘ ɴʘ		ŋǀ ɴǀ	ŋǃ ɴǃ		ŋ𝼊 ɴ𝼊	ŋǂ ɴǂ	ʞ	
Click (top: velar; bottom: uvular)	Tenuis lateral				kǁ qǁ					
Click (top: velar; bottom: uvular)	Voiced lateral				ɡǁ ɢǁ					
Click (top: velar; bottom: uvular)	Nasal lateral				ŋǁ ɴǁ					
