= Pulmonic-contour click =

Class of click consonant sounds

Tenuis alveolar linguo-pulmonic stop

ǃ͡q

Voiced dental linguo-pulmonic stop

ǀ͡ɢ

Aspirated lateral linguo-pulmonic stop

ǁ͡qʰ

Breathy-voiced palatal linguo-pulmonic stop

ǂ͡ɢʱ

Voiceless labial linguo-pulmonic affricate

ʘ͡χ

Voiced retroflex linguo-pulmonic affricate

𝼊͡ʁ

Pulmonic-contour clicks, also called sequential linguo-pulmonic consonants, are consonants that transition from a click to an ordinary pulmonic sound, or more precisely, have an audible delay between the front and rear release of the click. All click types (alveolar ǃ, dental ǀ, lateral ǁ, palatal ǂ, retroflex 𝼊 and labial ʘ) have linguo-pulmonic variants, which occur as both stops and affricates, and are attested in four phonations: tenuis, voiced, aspirated, and murmured (breathy voiced). At least a voiceless linguo-pulmonic affricate is attested from all Khoisan languages of southern Africa (the Khoe, Tuu, and Kxʼa language families), as well as (reportedly) from the Bantu language Yeyi from the same area, but they are unattested elsewhere.

== Analysis ==
Traditionally, contour clicks were believed to be uvular in their rear articulation, whereas non-contour clicks were thought to be velar. However, it is now known that all clicks are uvular, at least in the languages that have been investigated, and that the articulation of these clicks is more complex than that of others but no different in location. Miller (2011) analyzes them as contours (that is, as a transition from one kind of sound to another within a single consonant), whereas Nakagawa (2006) analyzes them as sequences of a click followed by a uvular consonant (that is, as consonant clusters). The benefit of a cluster analysis is that it greatly reduces the consonant inventory of the language. Taa, for example, has 164 known consonants, including 111 (and potentially 115) clicks, an extraordinary number considering that the largest inventory of any language without clicks, that of Ubykh, is 80 (84 consonants including loanwords). With a cluster analysis, the number of clicks in Taa is reduced to 43, and the total number of consonants to 87, only slightly surpassing Ubykh for the most consonants in the world. (Note: In Naumann's analysis, not just contour clicks but 20 others are analyzed as clusters.) There are, however, some disadvantages to a cluster analysis: Although the click series and non-click series can often be made to align, in some languages there are consonants in these purported clusters that never occur alone, something that never happens with other kinds of consonants. Also, all other languages in the world that allow obstruent clusters (as English does with s and t in steep, and as these click clusters would be) also allow clusters with sonorants (as English does with r in treat). However, no Khoisan language allows a cluster of any consonant, click or otherwise, with sonorants like l, r, y or w. Miller concludes that the remarkably large numbers of consonants in these languages is real, a consequence of the greater number of permutations of clicks, where there are two places of articulation that can be independently manipulated. (Note: There are other complex consonants, such as the labial–velars [k͡p], [ɡ͡b], and [ŋ͡m], but in such cases the two places of articulation are not independent.)

== Description ==
Phonetically, a linguo-pulmonic consonant is a click in which the forward and rear articulations are released independently. The forward articulation, made with the lips or the front of the tongue, releases with a lingual airstream as in any click. The rear articulation, however, is held longer, and when it is released, it is with a pulmonic airstream. (Linguo-ejective consonants are similar, except that the second release is ejective.) That is, such consonants have a double release burst, one ingressive (the air pulled in by the tongue) and the other egressive (the air pushed out by the lungs). The rear articulation is involved in both: it helps create the suction that powers the first, and then is itself released for the second. Because the back of the tongue operates in the uvular or pharyngeal part of the mouth to generate the first burst, and the two bursts are very close together in time, the second release is uvular as well.

== Types ==
Six series of pulmonic-contour clicks (as classified by the rear release) are attested. There are two manners of articulation (stop and fricative) and four voicing contrasts, each of which is found for each of the places of articulation (as classified by the front release) that clicks use.

Linguo-pulmonic stops

In linguo-pulmonic stops, the rear articulation is released into a pulmonic stop. This may be tenuis, aspirated, voiced, or murmured (breathy-voiced). The modally voiced and breathy-voiced clicks tend to be prenasalized in the various languages which use them, for reasons which are not clear. They tend to be written with a ⟨q⟩ before or after the letter for the click, and with an ⟨h⟩ afterward for the aspirated and breathy-voiced clicks. In IPA, using the alveolar series as an example, the four attested series of linguo-pulmonic stops may be transcribed ⟨ǃ͡q⟩, ⟨ǃ͡qʰ⟩, ⟨ǃ͡ɢ⟩, ⟨ǃ͡ɢʱ⟩, with the possibility of ⟨ɴǃ͡ɢ⟩ or ⟨ɴǃ͡ɢʱ⟩ to indicate the prenasalization. The breathy-voiced consonants of some languages such as Juǀʼhoansi, including clicks, contain a voiceless interval and are sometimes written with mixed voicing. Miller (2003) attributes this to a larger glottal opening than is found in for example Hindustani breathy-voiced consonants.

Linguo-pulmonic affricates

The rear articulation may also be released as a fricative, one which may be either voiceless or voiced. Aspiration / breathy voice is not distinctive, as fricatives are not easily aspirated. However, because the forward articulation may be considered a stop, these are called affricates rather than fricatives. (Note: Aspirated affricates are common—English ch is one—but those are true affricates, with the two elements made in the same location.) There are two conventions for writing the frication: the English convention, with an ⟨x⟩, and the Afrikaans tradition, with a ⟨g⟩. Both are used in the orthographies of Khoisan languages. In Juǀ’hõa, for example, they are written voiceless ⟨ǃx ǁx ǀx ǂx⟩ and voiced ⟨gǃx gǁx gǀx gǂx⟩, and in the old orthography ⟨qg xg cg çg⟩ and ⟨dqg dxg dcg dçg⟩; in Naro, they are (voiceless) ⟨qg xg cg tcg⟩, and in Khoekhoe ⟨ǃkh ǁkh ǀkh ǂkh⟩. In the IPA, the two series of linguo-pulmonic affricates may be written ⟨ǃ͡χ⟩ and ⟨ǃ͡ʁ⟩, though with a cluster analysis they would be ⟨ǃq͡χ⟩ and ⟨ǃɢ͡ʁ⟩.

These clicks are affricates at the posterior place of articulation; they are independent of the fricated alveolar clicks, which are affricates at their anterior place of articulation, a manner which does not affect the airstream. The fricated alveolar clicks may be lingual or linguo-pulmonic—that is, they may be affricates at both places of articulation, or at one.

== See also ==
- Ejective-contour clicks
- Glottalized clicks
- Nasal clicks

== Notes ==
Place →	Labial					Coronal										Dorsal					Laryngeal			
Manner ↓	Bilabial		Labiodental		Linguolabial		Dental		Alveolar		Postalveolar		Retroflex		(Alveolo-)palatal		Velar		Uvular		Pharyngeal/epiglottal		Glottal	
Nasal	m̥	m	ɱ̊	ɱ		n̼	n̪̊	n̪	n̥	n	n̠̊	n̠	ɳ̊	ɳ	ɲ̊	ɲ	ŋ̊	ŋ	ɴ̥	ɴ				
Plosive	p	b	p̪	b̪	t̼	d̼	t̪	d̪	t	d			ʈ	ɖ	c	ɟ	k	ɡ	q	ɢ	ʡ		ʔ	
Sibilant affricate							t̪s̪	d̪z̪	ts	dz	t̠ʃ	d̠ʒ	tʂ	dʐ	tɕ	dʑ								
Non-sibilant affricate	pɸ	bβ	p̪f	b̪v			t̪θ	d̪ð	tɹ̝̊	dɹ̝	t̠ɹ̠̊˔	d̠ɹ̠˔			cç	ɟʝ	kx	ɡɣ	qχ	ɢʁ	ʡʜ	ʡʢ	ʔh	
Sibilant fricative							s̪	z̪	s	z	ʃ	ʒ	ʂ	ʐ	ɕ	ʑ								
Non-sibilant fricative	ɸ	β	f	v	θ̼	ð̼	θ	ð	θ̠	ð̠	ɹ̠̊˔	ɹ̠˔	ɻ̊˔	ɻ˔	ç	ʝ	x	ɣ	χ	ʁ	ħ	ʕ	h	ɦ
Approximant		β̞		ʋ				ð̞		ɹ		ɹ̠		ɻ		j		ɰ						˷
Tap/flap		ⱱ̟		ⱱ					ɾ̥	ɾ			ɽ̊	ɽ						ɢ̆		ʡ̆		
Trill	ʙ̥	ʙ							r̥	r		r̠	ɽ̊r̥	ɽr					ʀ̥	ʀ	ʜ	ʢ		
Lateral affricate									tɬ	dɮ			tꞎ	d𝼅	c𝼆	ɟʎ̝	k𝼄	ɡʟ̝						
Lateral fricative							ɬ̪		ɬ	ɮ			ꞎ	𝼅	𝼆	ʎ̝	𝼄	ʟ̝						
Lateral approximant								l̪	l̥	l		l̠	ɭ̊	ɭ	ʎ̥	ʎ	ʟ̥	ʟ		ʟ̠				
Lateral tap/flap									ɺ̥	ɺ			𝼈̊	𝼈		ʎ̆		ʟ̆						

		BL	LD	D	A	PA	RF	P	V	U
Implosive	Voiced	ɓ			ɗ		ᶑ	ʄ	ɠ	ʛ
Implosive	Voiceless	ɓ̥			ɗ̥		ᶑ̊	ʄ̊	ɠ̊	ʛ̥
Ejective	Stop	pʼ			tʼ		ʈʼ	cʼ	kʼ	qʼ
Ejective	Affricate		p̪fʼ	t̪θʼ	tsʼ	t̠ʃʼ	tʂʼ	tɕʼ	kxʼ	qχʼ
Ejective	Fricative	ɸʼ	fʼ	θʼ	sʼ	ʃʼ	ʂʼ	ɕʼ	xʼ	χʼ
Ejective	Lateral affricate				tɬʼ			c𝼆ʼ	k𝼄ʼ	q𝼄ʼ
Ejective	Lateral fricative				ɬʼ					
Click (top: velar; bottom: uvular)	Tenuis	kʘ qʘ		kǀ qǀ	kǃ qǃ		k𝼊 q𝼊	kǂ qǂ		
Click (top: velar; bottom: uvular)	Voiced	ɡʘ ɢʘ		ɡǀ ɢǀ	ɡǃ ɢǃ		ɡ𝼊 ɢ𝼊	ɡǂ ɢǂ		
Click (top: velar; bottom: uvular)	Nasal	ŋʘ ɴʘ		ŋǀ ɴǀ	ŋǃ ɴǃ		ŋ𝼊 ɴ𝼊	ŋǂ ɴǂ	ʞ	
Click (top: velar; bottom: uvular)	Tenuis lateral				kǁ qǁ					
Click (top: velar; bottom: uvular)	Voiced lateral				ɡǁ ɢǁ					
Click (top: velar; bottom: uvular)	Nasal lateral				ŋǁ ɴǁ					
