= Poloka =

Coordinates: 23°35′55″S 26°17′7″E

Location of Poloka

Poloka is a village in Central District of Botswana. The village is located 120 km north of the capital city Gaborone and 80 km south-east of Mahalapye. Poloka has a primary school, and the population was 563 in 2001 census.
