= Contour (linguistics) =

Speech sounds behaving as single segments but with an internal transition

In phonetics, contour describes speech sounds that behave as single segments but make an internal transition from one quality, place, or manner to another. Such sounds may be tones, vowels, or consonants.

Many tone languages have contour tones, which move from one level to another. For example, Mandarin Chinese has four lexical tones. The high tone is level, without contour; the falling tone is a contour from high pitch to low; the rising tone a contour from mid pitch to high, and, when spoken in isolation, the low tone takes on a dipping contour, mid to low and then to high pitch. They are transcribed with series of either diacritics or tone letters, which with proper font support fuse into an iconic shape: [ma˨˩˦].

In the case of vowels, the terms diphthong and triphthong are used instead of 'contour'. They are vowels that glide from one place of articulation to another, as in English boy and bow. They are officially transcribed with a non-syllabic sign under one of the vowel letters: [bɔɪ̯], [baʊ̯]. However, when there is no chance of confusion, the diacritic is often omitted for simplicity.

The most common contour consonants are by far the affricates, such as English ch and j. They start out as one manner, a stop, and release into a different manner, a fricative, but behave as single consonants: [t͡ʃ], [d͡ʒ]. Other types of transition are attested in consonants, such as prenasalized stops in many African languages and nasal release in Slavic languages, the retroflex trill [ɽr] of Toda, the trilled affricate [ʈ͡r] of Fijian, voicing contours [d͡tʰ], [ɡ͡k͡xʼ] in ǃXóõ, and even click contours (airstream contours) in Khoisan languages such as Nǁng, which start with a lingual (velaric) airstream mechanism and release with either a pulmonic mechanism (linguo-pulmonic clicks such as [ǃ͡q], [ǂ͡χ]) or an ejective mechanism (linguo-glottalic clicks such as [ǃʼ], [ǂ͡χʼ]).

Types of contour
Transition in	Example	Where found
Tone	[ma˨˩˦]	China, Southeast Asia, Liberia, Khoisan languages
Vowels
Place	diphthongs	worldwide
Nasalization	[aũ]	
Phonation	[ḁ_{)}], [a ̰]	
Consonants
Manner	affricates	worldwide
Manner	nasalization	Africa, New Guinea, Slavic languages
Manner	trilled	Wari, Toda, Malagasy
Voicing	[d͡tʰ], [_{(}s̬]	Khoisan languages
Airstream	[ǃ͡q]	Khoisan languages
Place	[s͢θ]	sliding articulation in disordered speech

== See also ==
- Tone contour
- Pitch contour
- Contour tone
