= International Development Design Summit =

Project to improve quality of life in third world countries

- Website type: Academic conference
- Available in: English, multilingual subtitle, transcript
- Headquarters: Cambridge, Massachusetts, {{{location_country}}}
- Area served: Worldwide
- Founder: Amy B. Smith
- Website: www.idin.org/what-we-do/international-development-design-summits
- Launched: 2007
- Current status: Active

The International Development Design Summit (IDDS) is a collaboration to find cost effective technology solutions for the third world. It was first held in 2007 at MIT. It is held annually to study problems in the developing world and create real, workable solutions to them.

== Background ==
"I believe very strongly that solutions to problems in the developing world are best created in collaboration with the people who will be using them", said founder Amy Smith . "By bringing this group of people together, we get an incredibly broad range of backgrounds and experiences.

WorldChanging reported on August 14, 2007 that the results from the first International Development Design Summit (IDDS) had been very positive with end products including an off-grid refrigeration unit tailored for rural areas using an evaporative cooling method to store perishable food and a low-cost greenhouse from recycled and widely available materials.

== See also ==
- International development
