= Alveolar click =

Click consonant sound

Alveolar click type

ǃ ʗ
- IPA number: 178, 202

Audio sample
- source · help

Encoding
- Entity (decimal): &#451;&#663;
- Unicode (hex): U+01C3 U+0297
- X-SAMPA: !\
- Braille: ⠯ (braille pattern dots-12346) ⠞ (braille pattern dots-2345)
Image

Tenuis alveolar click (velar)

kǃ kʗ

ᵏǃ ᵏʗ

ǃ ʗ

Voiced alveolar click (velar)

ɡǃ ɡʗ

ᶢǃ ᶢʗ

ǃ̬ ʗ̬

Alveolar nasal click (velar)

ŋǃ ŋʗ

ᵑǃ ᵑʗ

ǃ̃ ʗ̃

Audio sample
- source · help

Tenuis alveolar click (uvular)

qǃ qʗ

𐞥ǃ 𐞥ʗ

Voiced alveolar click (uvular)

ɢǃ ɢʗ

𐞒ǃ 𐞒ʗ

Alveolar nasal click (uvular)

ɴǃ ɴʗ

ᶰǃ ᶰʗ

The alveolar or postalveolar clicks are a family of click consonants found only in Africa and in the Damin ritual jargon of Australia. The tongue is more or less concave (depending on the language), and is pulled down rather than back as in the palatal clicks, making a hollower sound than those consonants.

The symbol in the International Phonetic Alphabet that represents the place of articulation of these sounds is ⟨ǃ⟩. The symbol is not an exclamation mark in origin, but rather a vertical bar with a subscript dot, the dot being the old diacritic for retroflex consonants, as the articulation corresponds to some conceptions of a retroflex consonant (but see retroflex clicks). Prior to 1989, ⟨ʗ⟩ (stretched c) was the IPA letter for the alveolar clicks, and this is still preferred by some phoneticians. The tail of ⟨ʗ⟩ may be the tail of retroflex consonants in the IPA, and thus analogous to the underdot of ⟨ǃ⟩. Either letter may be combined with a second letter or a diacritic to indicate voicing and the manner of articulation, though this is commonly omitted for tenuis clicks.

== Alveolar click consonants and their transcription ==
In official IPA transcription, the click letter is combined with a ⟨k ɡ ŋ q ɢ ɴ⟩ via a tie bar, though ⟨k⟩ is frequently omitted. Many authors instead use a superscript ⟨k ɡ ŋ q ɢ ɴ⟩ without the tie bar, again often neglecting the ⟨k⟩. Either letter, whether baseline or superscript, is usually placed before the click letter, but may come after when the release of the velar or uvular occlusion is audible. A third convention is the click letter with diacritics for voicelessness, voicing and nasalization; this would require something like the guttural diacritic ◌̴ to distinguish uvular–alveolar clicks. Common alveolar clicks in these three transcriptions are:

| Trans. I | Trans. II | Trans. III | Description |
(velar)
| ⟨k͜ǃ⟩ | ⟨ᵏǃ⟩ | ⟨ǃ⟩ | tenuis alveolar click |
| ⟨k͜ǃʰ⟩ | ⟨ᵏǃʰ⟩ | ⟨ǃʰ⟩ | aspirated alveolar click |
| ⟨ɡ͜ǃ⟩ | ⟨ᶢǃ⟩ | ⟨ǃ̬⟩ | voiced alveolar click |
| ⟨ŋ͜ǃ⟩ | ⟨ᵑǃ⟩ | ⟨ǃ̬̃⟩ | alveolar nasal click |
| ⟨ŋ̊͜ǃʰʰ⟩ | ⟨ᵑ̥ǃʰʰ⟩ | ⟨ǃ̥̃ʰʰ⟩ | aspirated alveolar nasal click |
| ⟨ŋ͜ǃˀ⟩ | ⟨ᵑǃˀ⟩ | ⟨ǃ̃ˀ⟩ | glottalized alveolar nasal click |
(uvular)
| ⟨q͜ǃ⟩ | ⟨𐞥ǃ⟩ | ⟨ǃ̴⟩ | tenuis alveolar click |
| ⟨q͜ǃʰ⟩ | ⟨𐞥ǃʰ⟩ | ⟨ǃ̴ʰ⟩ | aspirated alveolar click |
| ⟨ɢ͜ǃ⟩ | ⟨𐞒ǃ⟩ | ⟨ǃ̴̬⟩ | voiced alveolar click |
| ⟨ɴ͜ǃ⟩ | ⟨ᶰǃ⟩ | ⟨ǃ̴̬̃⟩ | alveolar nasal click |
| ⟨ɴ̥͜ǃʰʰ⟩ | ⟨ᶰ̥ǃʰʰ⟩ | ⟨ǃ̴̥̃ʰʰ⟩ | aspirated alveolar nasal click |
| ⟨ɴ͜ǃˀ⟩ | ⟨ᶰǃˀ⟩ | ⟨ǃ̴̃ˀ⟩ | glottalized alveolar nasal click |

The last can be heard in the sound sample at right; non-native speakers tend to glottalize clicks to avoid nasalizing them. The nasal click may also be heard at the right.

In the orthographies of individual languages, the letters and digraphs for alveolar clicks may be based on either the vertical bar symbol of the IPA, ⟨ǃ⟩, or on the Latin ⟨q⟩ of Bantu convention. Khoekhoe and most Bushman languages use the former; Naro, Sandawe, and Zulu use the latter.

== Features ==
Features of postalveolar clicks:

- The basic articulation may be voiced, nasal, aspirated, glottalized, etc.
- The forward place of articulation is alveolar or postalveolar, depending on the language, and apical, which means it is articulated with the tip of the tongue against the alveolar ridge or the roof of the mouth behind the alveolar ridge. (Damin contrasted these two articulations as separate phonemes.) The release is a sharp, plosive sound in southern Africa, but in Sandawe it may be percussive, with the underside of the tip of the tongue striking the floor of the mouth after the release of the click (see below), and in Hadza the release is often quite weak.
- Clicks may be oral or nasal, which means that the airflow is either restricted to the mouth, or passes through the nose as well.
- They are median consonants, which means they are produced by releasing the airstream at the midline of the tongue, rather than at the sides.
- The airstream mechanism is lingual ingressive (also known as velaric ingressive), which means a pocket of air trapped between two closures is rarefied by a "sucking" action of the tongue, rather than being moved by the glottis or the lungs/diaphragm. The release of the forward closure produces the "click" sound. Voiced and nasal clicks have a simultaneous pulmonic egressive airstream.

== Occurrence ==
English does not have an alveolar click (or any other click consonant) as a phoneme, but a plain alveolar click does occur in mimesis, as a sound children use to imitate a horse trotting.

| Language | Word | IPA | Meaning | Notes |
|---|---|---|---|---|
| !Kung | nǃan | [ᵑǃáŋ] = [ʗ̃áŋ] | 'inside' | |
| Hadza | laqo | [laᵏǃo] = [laʗ̊o] | 'to trip' | |
| Hadza | keqhena | [keᵏǃʰena] = [keʗ̊ʰena] | 'to be slow' | |
| Hadza | henqee | [ɦeᵑǃeʔe] = [ɦeʗ̃eʔe] | 'dead leopard' | |
| Hadza | teqqe | [teᵑǃˀe] = [teʗ̃ˀe] | 'to carry' | |
| Sandawe | gqokomi | [ᶢǃokomi] = [ʗ̬okomi] | 'greater kudu' | may have a slapped release: [ǃ̬͡¡okomi] = [ʗ̬͡¡okomi] |
| Sotho | ho qoqa | [hoᵏǃɔᵏǃɑ] = [hoʗ̊ɔʗ̊ɑ] | 'to chat/converse' | Contrasts with murmured, aspirated, and alveolar nasal clicks. See Sotho phonology |
| Xhosa | iqanda | [iᵏǃanda] = [iʗ̊anda] | 'egg' | Contrasts with murmured, aspirated, and alveolar nasal clicks |
| ǃXóõ | ǃqhàà | [ǃ͡qʰɑ̀ː] = [ʗ͡qʰɑ̀ː] | 'water' | An aspirated linguo-pulmonic stop |
| Zulu | iqaqa | [iːᵏǃáːᵏǃa] = [iːʗ̊áːʗ̊a] | 'polecat' | Contrasts with murmured, aspirated, and alveolar nasal clicks. |

== Percussive release ==
Percussive alveolar click (tenuis velar)

ᵏǃ¡ ᵏʗ¡

kǃꜞ kʗꜞ

ǃ¡

Audio sample
- source · help

Percussive palatal click (nasal velar)

ᵑǂ¡ ᵑ𝼋¡

ŋǂꜞ ŋ𝼋ꜞ

In Sandawe, alveolar clicks commonly have a ballistic release, with the underside of the tip of the tongue subsequently striking the floor of the mouth. This allophone has been called "slapped" or "flapped" (not to be confused with flap consonants, such as the reduced alveolar clicks of Hadza). Sometimes the percussive slap is louder than the release, resulting in a sound that has been characterized as a "cluck". The symbol for the sublingual percussive component is ⟨¡⟩ in the extensions to the IPA; a slapped click is therefore transcribed ⟨ǃ͡¡⟩ or ⟨ǃꜞ⟩ (or ⟨ʗ͡¡, ʗꜞ⟩). The percussive allophones of the five Sandawe alveolar clicks are [ᵏǃ͡¡, ᵏǃ͡¡ʰ, ᶢǃ͡¡, ᵑǃ͡¡, ᵑǃ͡¡ˀ] (or [ᵏʗꜞ ᵏʗꜞʰ ᶢʗꜞ ᵑʗꜞ ᵑʗꜞˀ] etc.).

Clement Doke also noted a palatal click with slapped release, [ᵑǂ¡].

Nasal clicks that fit this description are used in nursery rhymes by speakers of Gan Chinese and of Mandarin, with varying degrees of competence. See Chinese click sounds for details.

| Language | Word | IPA | Meaning | Notes |
|---|---|---|---|---|
| Sandawe | gqokomi | [ǃ̬͡¡okomi] = [ʗ̬͡¡okomi] | 'greater kudu' | common variant of [ᶢǃokomi] = [ʗ̬okomi] |

== "Fricated" alveolar clicks ==
A series of clicks in Ekoka !Kung have been variously described as retroflex or fricated palatal clicks.

== See also ==
- Bilabial click
- Dental click
- Lateral click
- Palatal click
- Retroflex click
- Index of phonetics articles

| Place → | Labial | | | | | Coronal | | | | | | | | | | Dorsal | | | | | Laryngeal | | | |
| Manner ↓ | Bilabial | | Labiodental | | Linguolabial | | Dental | | Alveolar | | Postalveolar | | Retroflex | | (Alveolo-)palatal | | Velar | | Uvular | | Pharyngeal/epiglottal | | Glottal | |
|---|---|---|---|---|---|---|---|---|---|---|---|---|---|---|---|---|---|---|---|---|---|---|---|---|
| Nasal | m̥ | m | ɱ̊ | ɱ | | n̼ | n̪̊ | n̪ | n̥ | n | n̠̊ | n̠ | ɳ̊ | ɳ | ɲ̊ | ɲ | ŋ̊ | ŋ | ɴ̥ | ɴ | | | | |
| Plosive | p | b | p̪ | b̪ | t̼ | d̼ | t̪ | d̪ | t | d | | | ʈ | ɖ | c | ɟ | k | ɡ | q | ɢ | ʡ | | ʔ | |
| Sibilant affricate | | | | | | | t̪s̪ | d̪z̪ | ts | dz | t̠ʃ | d̠ʒ | tʂ | dʐ | tɕ | dʑ | | | | | | | | |
| Non-sibilant affricate | pɸ | bβ | p̪f | b̪v | | | t̪θ | d̪ð | tɹ̝̊ | dɹ̝ | t̠ɹ̠̊˔ | d̠ɹ̠˔ | | | cç | ɟʝ | kx | ɡɣ | qχ | ɢʁ | ʡʜ | ʡʢ | ʔh | |
| Sibilant fricative | | | | | | | s̪ | z̪ | s | z | ʃ | ʒ | ʂ | ʐ | ɕ | ʑ | | | | | | | | |
| Non-sibilant fricative | ɸ | β | f | v | θ̼ | ð̼ | θ | ð | θ̠ | ð̠ | ɹ̠̊˔ | ɹ̠˔ | ɻ̊˔ | ɻ˔ | ç | ʝ | x | ɣ | χ | ʁ | ħ | ʕ | h | ɦ |
| Approximant | | β̞ | | ʋ | | | | ð̞ | | ɹ | | ɹ̠ | | ɻ | | j | | ɰ | | | | | | ˷ |
| Tap/flap | | ⱱ̟ | | ⱱ | | | | | ɾ̥ | ɾ | | | ɽ̊ | ɽ | | | | | | ɢ̆ | | ʡ̆ | | |
| Trill | ʙ̥ | ʙ | | | | | | | r̥ | r | | r̠ | ɽ̊r̥ | ɽr | | | | | ʀ̥ | ʀ | ʜ | ʢ | | |
| Lateral affricate | | | | | | | | | tɬ | dɮ | | | tꞎ | d𝼅 | c𝼆 | ɟʎ̝ | k𝼄 | ɡʟ̝ | | | | | | |
| Lateral fricative | | | | | | | ɬ̪ | | ɬ | ɮ | | | ꞎ | 𝼅 | 𝼆 | ʎ̝ | 𝼄 | ʟ̝ | | | | | | |
| Lateral approximant | | | | | | | | l̪ | l̥ | l | | l̠ | ɭ̊ | ɭ | ʎ̥ | ʎ | ʟ̥ | ʟ | | ʟ̠ | | | | |
| Lateral tap/flap | | | | | | | | | ɺ̥ | ɺ | | | 𝼈̊ | 𝼈 | | ʎ̆ | | ʟ̆ | | | | | | |

| | | BL | LD | D | A | PA | RF | P | V | U |
|---|---|---|---|---|---|---|---|---|---|---|
| Implosive | Voiced | ɓ | | | ɗ | | ᶑ | ʄ | ɠ | ʛ |
| Implosive | Voiceless | ɓ̥ | | | ɗ̥ | | ᶑ̊ | ʄ̊ | ɠ̊ | ʛ̥ |
| Ejective | Stop | pʼ | | | tʼ | | ʈʼ | cʼ | kʼ | qʼ |
| Ejective | Affricate | | p̪fʼ | tθʼ | tsʼ | tʃʼ | tʂʼ | tɕʼ | kxʼ | qχʼ |
| Ejective | Fricative | ɸʼ | fʼ | θʼ | sʼ | ʃʼ | ʂʼ | ɕʼ | xʼ | χʼ |
| Ejective | Lateral affricate | | | | tɬʼ | | | c𝼆ʼ | k𝼄ʼ | q𝼄ʼ |
| Ejective | Lateral fricative | | | | ɬʼ | | | | | |
| Click (top: velar; bottom: uvular) | Tenuis | kʘ qʘ | | kǀ qǀ | kǃ qǃ | | k𝼊 q𝼊 | kǂ qǂ | | |
| Click (top: velar; bottom: uvular) | Voiced | ɡʘ ɢʘ | | ɡǀ ɢǀ | ɡǃ ɢǃ | | ɡ𝼊 ɢ𝼊 | ɡǂ ɢǂ | | |
| Click (top: velar; bottom: uvular) | Nasal | ŋʘ ɴʘ | | ŋǀ ɴǀ | ŋǃ ɴǃ | | ŋ𝼊 ɴ𝼊 | ŋǂ ɴǂ | ʞ | |
| Click (top: velar; bottom: uvular) | Tenuis lateral | | | | kǁ qǁ | | | | | |
| Click (top: velar; bottom: uvular) | Voiced lateral | | | | ɡǁ ɢǁ | | | | | |
| Click (top: velar; bottom: uvular) | Nasal lateral | | | | ŋǁ ɴǁ | | | | | |
