= Lateral click =

Consonantal sound

Lateral click type

ǁ ʖ
- IPA number: 180

Audio sample
- source · help

Encoding
- Entity (decimal): &#449;&#662;
- Unicode (hex): U+01C1 U+0296
- X-SAMPA: |\|\
- Braille: ⠯ (braille pattern dots-12346) ⠇ (braille pattern dots-123)
Image

Tenuis lateral click (velar)

kǁ kʖ

ᵏǁ ᵏʖ

ǁ ʖ

Voiced lateral click (velar)

ɡǁ ɡʖ

ᶢǁ ᶢʖ

ǁ̬ ʖ̬

Nasal lateral click (velar)

ŋǁ ŋʖ

ᵑǁ ᵑʖ

ǁ̃ ʖ̃

Tenuis lateral click (uvular)

qǁ qʖ

𐞥ǁ 𐞥ʖ

Voiced lateral click (uvular)

ɢǁ ɢʖ

𐞒ǁ 𐞒ʖ

Nasal lateral click (uvular)

ɴǁ ɴʖ

ᶰǁ ᶰʖ

The lateral clicks are a family of click consonants found only in African languages. The clicking sound used by equestrians to urge on their horses is a lateral click, although it is not a speech sound in that context. Lateral clicks are found throughout southern Africa, for example in Zulu, and in some languages in Tanzania and Namibia. The place of articulation is not known to be contrastive in any language, and typically varies from alveolar to palatal.

The symbol in the International Phonetic Alphabet that represents a generic lateral click is ⟨ǁ⟩, a double vertical bar. (Note: This is encoded in Unicode as U+01C1 ǁ LATIN LETTER LATERAL CLICK, not to be confused with the similar U+2016 ‖ DOUBLE VERTICAL LINE.) Prior to 1989, ⟨ʖ⟩ (Note: Styled as either a digit ⟨5⟩ with the top removed, or an inverted glottal stop ⟨ʔ⟩. It perhaps derives from a cedilla ⟨¸⟩ written in the size of a full letter.) was the IPA letter for the lateral clicks, and this is still preferred by some phoneticians, as the double vertical bar may be confounded with the double-bar prosody mark ⟨‖⟩, with an iterated dental click ⟨ǀǀ⟩, and, in some fonts, with a double lowercase ⟨ll⟩. Either click letter may be combined with a second letter or diacritic to indicate voicing and the manner of articulation, though this is commonly omitted for tenuis clicks.

== Lateral click consonants and their transcription ==
In official IPA transcription, the click letter is combined with a ⟨k ɡ ŋ q ɢ ɴ⟩ via a tie bar, though ⟨k⟩ is frequently omitted. Many authors instead use a superscript ⟨k ɡ ŋ q ɢ ɴ⟩ without the tie bar, again often neglecting the ⟨k⟩. Either letter, whether baseline or superscript, is usually placed before the click letter, but may come after when the release of the velar or uvular occlusion is audible. A third convention is the click letter with diacritics for voicelessness, voicing and nasalization; this would require something like the guttural diacritic ◌̴ to distinguish uvular–lateral clicks. Common lateral clicks in these three transcriptions are:

Trans. I	Trans. II	Trans. III	Description
(velar)
⟨k͜ǁ⟩	⟨ᵏǁ⟩	⟨ǁ⟩	tenuis lateral click
⟨k͜ǁʰ⟩	⟨ᵏǁʰ⟩	⟨ǁʰ⟩	aspirated lateral click
⟨ɡ͜ǁ⟩	⟨ᶢǁ⟩	⟨ǁ̬⟩	voiced lateral click
⟨ŋ͜ǁ⟩	⟨ᵑǁ⟩	⟨ǁ̬̃⟩	lateral nasal click
⟨ŋ̊͜ǁʰʰ⟩	⟨ᵑ̥ǁʰʰ⟩	⟨ǁ̥̃ʰʰ⟩	aspirated lateral nasal click
⟨ŋ͜ǁˀ⟩	⟨ᵑǁˀ⟩	⟨ǁ̃ˀ⟩	glottalized lateral nasal click
(uvular)
⟨q͜ǁ⟩	⟨𐞥ǁ⟩	⟨ǁ̴⟩	tenuis lateral click
⟨q͜ǁʰ⟩	⟨𐞥ǁʰ⟩	⟨ǁ̴ʰ⟩	aspirated lateral click
⟨ɢ͜ǁ⟩	⟨𐞒ǁ⟩	⟨ǁ̴̬⟩	voiced lateral click
⟨ɴ͜ǁ⟩	⟨ᶰǁ⟩	⟨ǁ̴̬̃⟩	lateral nasal click
⟨ɴ̥͜ǁʰʰ⟩	⟨ᶰ̥ǁʰʰ⟩	⟨ǁ̴̥̃ʰʰ⟩	aspirated lateral nasal click
⟨ɴ͜ǁˀ⟩	⟨ᶰǁˀ⟩	⟨ǁ̴̃ˀ⟩	glottalized lateral nasal click

The last is what is heard in the sound sample above, as non-native speakers tend to glottalize clicks to avoid nasalizing them.

In the orthographies of individual languages, the letters and digraphs for lateral clicks may be based on either the vertical bar symbol of the IPA, ⟨ǁ⟩, or on the Latin ⟨x⟩ of Bantu convention. Nama and most Bushman languages use the former; Naro, Sandawe, and Zulu use the latter.

== Features ==
The specific articulation of lateral clicks may vary from language to language, from dental [ǁ̪] to palatal [ǁ̠], apical [ǁ̺] or laminal [ǁ̻]. No contrast between such articulations has been confirmed apart from the retroflex clicks, which may have a lateral release: [𝼊𐞷].

Features of lateral clicks:

- The basic articulation may be voiced, nasal, aspirated, glottalized, etc.
- The release of the forward place of articulation is a noisy, affricate-like sound in southern Africa, but abrupt in Hadza and Sandawe in East Africa.
- Clicks may be oral or nasal, which means that the airflow is either restricted to the mouth, or passes through the nose as well.
- They are lateral consonants, which means they are produced by releasing the airstream at the side of the tongue, rather than in the middle. Some speakers pronounce them on one side of the mouth, some on both.
- The airstream mechanism is lingual ingressive (also known as velaric ingressive), which means a pocket of air trapped between two closures is rarefied by a "sucking" action of the tongue, rather than being moved by the glottis or the lungs/diaphragm. The release of the forward closure produces the "click" sound. Voiced and nasal clicks have a simultaneous pulmonic egressive airstream.

Regarding Khoekhoe, Tindall notes that European learners almost invariably pronounce these sounds as simple laterals, by placing the tongue against the side teeth, and that this articulation is "harsh and foreign to the native ear". The Nama instead cover the whole of the palate with the tongue, and produce the sound "as far back in the palate as possible".

== Occurrence ==
The English language does not have a lateral click (or any click consonant, for that matter) as a phoneme, but an unreleased (Note: In the English sound, the velar closure is not released, unlike the released sounds found in languages that combine clicks with vowels.) lateral click does occur as an interjection, usually written tchick! or tchek! (and often reduplicated tchick-tchick!), used to urge a horse to move. A form of click can also be heard by some English speakers when scoffing, but this is generally a dental click rather than a lateral click.

Language	Word	IPA	Meaning	Notes
ǃKung	nǁan	[ᵑǁàŋ] = [ʖ̃àŋ]	'marama bean'	
Hadza	exekeke	[ʔeᵏǁekeke] = [ʔeʖ̥ekeke]	'to listen'	
Hadza	naxhi	[naᵏǁʰi] = [naʖ̥ʰi]	'to crowd'	
Hadza	konxa	[koᵑǁa] = [koʖ̃a]	'to be a pair'	
Hadza	slaxxa	[ɬaᵑǁˀa] = [ɬaʖ̃ˀa]	'a split, fork'	
Xhosa	isiXhosa	[isiᵏǁʰosa] = [isiʖ̥ʰosa]	'Xhosa language'	Contrasts tenuis, murmured, aspirated, and nasal lateral clicks.
!Xóõ	ǁnáã	[ᵑǁɑ́ɑ̃] = [ʖ̃ɑ́ɑ̃]	'grewia berry'	
Zulu	xoxa	[ᵏǁɔ́ːᵏǁa] = [ʖ̥ɔ́ːʖ̥a]	'to converse'	

== See also ==
- Fricated palatal click (described as having a lateral release)
- Retroflex click (has a fricated lateral release)

== Notes ==
Place →	Labial					Coronal										Dorsal					Laryngeal			
Manner ↓	Bilabial		Labiodental		Linguolabial		Dental		Alveolar		Postalveolar		Retroflex		(Alveolo-)palatal		Velar		Uvular		Pharyngeal/epiglottal		Glottal	
Nasal	m̥	m	ɱ̊	ɱ		n̼	n̪̊	n̪	n̥	n	n̠̊	n̠	ɳ̊	ɳ	ɲ̊	ɲ	ŋ̊	ŋ	ɴ̥	ɴ				
Plosive	p	b	p̪	b̪	t̼	d̼	t̪	d̪	t	d			ʈ	ɖ	c	ɟ	k	ɡ	q	ɢ	ʡ		ʔ	
Sibilant affricate							t̪s̪	d̪z̪	ts	dz	t̠ʃ	d̠ʒ	tʂ	dʐ	tɕ	dʑ								
Non-sibilant affricate	pɸ	bβ	p̪f	b̪v			t̪θ	d̪ð	tɹ̝̊	dɹ̝	t̠ɹ̠̊˔	d̠ɹ̠˔			cç	ɟʝ	kx	ɡɣ	qχ	ɢʁ	ʡʜ	ʡʢ	ʔh	
Sibilant fricative							s̪	z̪	s	z	ʃ	ʒ	ʂ	ʐ	ɕ	ʑ								
Non-sibilant fricative	ɸ	β	f	v	θ̼	ð̼	θ	ð	θ̠	ð̠	ɹ̠̊˔	ɹ̠˔	ɻ̊˔	ɻ˔	ç	ʝ	x	ɣ	χ	ʁ	ħ	ʕ	h	ɦ
Approximant		β̞		ʋ				ð̞		ɹ		ɹ̠		ɻ		j		ɰ						˷
Tap/flap		ⱱ̟		ⱱ					ɾ̥	ɾ			ɽ̊	ɽ						ɢ̆		ʡ̆		
Trill	ʙ̥	ʙ							r̥	r		r̠	ɽ̊r̥	ɽr					ʀ̥	ʀ	ʜ	ʢ		
Lateral affricate									tɬ	dɮ			tꞎ	d𝼅	c𝼆	ɟʎ̝	k𝼄	ɡʟ̝						
Lateral fricative							ɬ̪		ɬ	ɮ			ꞎ	𝼅	𝼆	ʎ̝	𝼄	ʟ̝						
Lateral approximant								l̪	l̥	l		l̠	ɭ̊	ɭ	ʎ̥	ʎ	ʟ̥	ʟ		ʟ̠				
Lateral tap/flap									ɺ̥	ɺ			𝼈̊	𝼈		ʎ̆		ʟ̆						

		BL	LD	D	A	PA	RF	P	V	U
Implosive	Voiced	ɓ			ɗ		ᶑ	ʄ	ɠ	ʛ
Implosive	Voiceless	ɓ̥			ɗ̥		ᶑ̊	ʄ̊	ɠ̊	ʛ̥
Ejective	Stop	pʼ			tʼ		ʈʼ	cʼ	kʼ	qʼ
Ejective	Affricate		p̪fʼ	tθʼ	tsʼ	tʃʼ	tʂʼ	tɕʼ	kxʼ	qχʼ
Ejective	Fricative	ɸʼ	fʼ	θʼ	sʼ	ʃʼ	ʂʼ	ɕʼ	xʼ	χʼ
Ejective	Lateral affricate				tɬʼ			c𝼆ʼ	k𝼄ʼ	q𝼄ʼ
Ejective	Lateral fricative				ɬʼ					
Click (top: velar; bottom: uvular)	Tenuis	kʘ qʘ		kǀ qǀ	kǃ qǃ		k𝼊 q𝼊	kǂ qǂ		
Click (top: velar; bottom: uvular)	Voiced	ɡʘ ɢʘ		ɡǀ ɢǀ	ɡǃ ɢǃ		ɡ𝼊 ɢ𝼊	ɡǂ ɢǂ		
Click (top: velar; bottom: uvular)	Nasal	ŋʘ ɴʘ		ŋǀ ɴǀ	ŋǃ ɴǃ		ŋ𝼊 ɴ𝼊	ŋǂ ɴǂ	ʞ	
Click (top: velar; bottom: uvular)	Tenuis lateral				kǁ qǁ					
Click (top: velar; bottom: uvular)	Voiced lateral				ɡǁ ɢǁ					
Click (top: velar; bottom: uvular)	Nasal lateral				ŋǁ ɴǁ					
