= International auxiliary language orthography =

Writing systems of languages designed for international communication

International auxiliary language orthography (IAL orthography) is often simplified when compared with natural language orthography.

== Script ==
Most IALs use Latin script for their standard writing.

== Letter inventory ==
Most IAL writing systems use only letters from the ISO basic Latin alphabet, but there are some exceptions.

- Volapük originally had three additional letters ꞛ, ꞝ, and ꞟ, devised by Schleyer himself. However, they have never been used much. They were replaced with vowels with Umlaut: ä, ö and ü. Volapük has no official method for avoiding the diacritic, but sometimes they are substituted with ay, oy and uy. This method is not used much, since the sequence oy occurs in "normal" Volapük, too.
- Esperanto has six letters with diacritics: ĉ, ĝ, ĥ, ĵ, ŝ, and ŭ. To avoid the diacritics, Esperanto offers two alternative orthographies.
- Uropi has ʒ.
- Universalglot has "œ", "σ" and "ü".
- Kotava uses accented á, é, í, ú in the 1st person singular of the verbal conjugation to express stress. These letters are not part of the official alphabet though.

== Digraphs ==
Although most IALs eschew digraphs, there are some IALs that use digraphs:

- Interlingua: ch, qu, ph, sh
- Ido: ch, qu, sh
- Novial: ch, sh
- Esperanto
  - H-system: ch (for ĉ), gh (for ĝ), hh (for ĥ), jh (for ĵ), and sh (for ŝ).
  - X-system: cx (for ĉ), gx (for ĝ), hx (for ĥ), jx (for ĵ), sx (for ŝ), and ux (for ŭ).
- Slovio uses Esperanto's X-system as well: cx, gx, hx, sx, wx, zx.

== Collation ==
The basic ordering of the letters is as in the ISO basic Latin alphabet.

Esperanto sorts each letter with diacritic mark directly after the corresponding letter without such a mark. Uropi sorts the non-ASCII ʒ after all ASCII letters, i.e. after z.
