= Esperanto Braille =

Braille alphabet of the Esperanto language

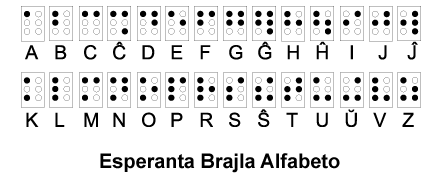
- Script type: alphabet
- Print basis: Esperanto alphabet
- Languages: Esperanto

Related scripts
- Parent systems: Braille: Esperanto Braille

The Esperanto language has a dedicated braille alphabet. One Esperanto braille magazine, Esperanta Ligilo, has been published since 1904, and another, Aŭroro, since 1920.

== Alphabet ==
The basic braille alphabet is extended for the print letters with diacritics. The circumflex is marked by adding dot 6 (lower right) to the base letter: ⠩ ĉ, ⠻ ĝ, ⠳ ĥ, ⠺ ĵ, ⠮ ŝ. Therefore, the letter ĵ has the same form as the unused French/English Braille letter ⠺ w; to write a w in a foreign name, dot 3 is added: ⠾ w (see next section). Esperanto ŭ is made by reflecting u, so that dot 1 becomes dot 4: ⠬ ŭ. The alphabet is thus as follows.

| a | b | c | ĉ | d | e | f |
| g | ĝ | h | ĥ | i | j | ĵ |
| k | l | m | n | o | p | r |
| s | ŝ | t | u | ŭ | v | z |

Contracted braille is in limited use.

=== Transcribing foreign letters ===
Beside the basic-Latin foreign letters q, w, x, y, there are dedicated letters for the umlauted vowels that occur in print German, ä, ö, ü:

| q | w | x | y | ä | ö | ü |

Additional accented letters in other languages are handled by separate braille cells for the diacritics. These do not have a one-to-one correspondence with print:

| ◌́ (and ő, ű from ö, ü) | ◌̀, ◌̄ | ◌̃ | ◌̂, ◌̌ | ◌̈, ◌̇ | ◌̊, ◌̆ | ◌̧, ◌̨, ◌̣, ◌̩ | ◌̸, ◌̵, etc. |

These conventions are used for foreign names adapted to Esperanto Braille. Unassimilated text in another braille alphabet is indicated by the code ⠐⠂.

== Punctuation ==
Single punctuation

| space | , | ' and abbr. | . | ? | ! | ; | : |
| * | / | ... | | | - | — | |

The apostrophe and abbreviation point are both transcribed ⠄, which is distinct from the period/stop, ⠲. A series of colons, ⠒⠒⠒, is a common dinkus for dividing sections of texts.

Paired punctuation

| ... outer quotes | ... inner quotes |
| ... ( ... ) | ... [ ... ] |

Quotation marks in ink-print Esperanto are highly variable, and tend to follow the conventions of the country a text is published in. This is irrelevant for rendering in braille.

== Numbers ==
The apostrophe/abbreviation point ⠄ is used to group digits within numbers, like the comma in English. In both print and braille Esperanto, the comma is used as the decimal mark, so:

print English 100,000.00
= print Esperanto 100 000,00
= braille ⠼⠁⠚⠚⠄⠚⠚⠚⠂⠚⠚.

== Formatting ==
Capitals are only marked for proper names. They are not used at the beginning of a sentence.

| digit | capital | emph. | ... emphasis span |
| ... alternative emphasis span | | | ... foreign braille text |

For emphasis (bold or italics in print), a simple ⠸ is used to mark each of one to three words. For longer emphatic text, there are two formats: Either a colon precedes the simple emphatic sign, ⠒⠸, and an additional sign ⠸ is placed before the last emphasized word, or the sign ⠠⠄ is placed before and after the emphasized text.

In contracted (grade 2) braille, a different sign is used for capital letters, ⠠ (dot 6). As in most braille orthographies, proper names are not contracted, and words preceded by this sign are not contracted in Esperanto Braille.
