= ISO/IEC 8859-3 =

ISO standard

- MIME / IANA: ISO-8859-3
- Alias(es): iso-ir-109, latin3, l3, csISOLatin3
- Languages: Maltese, Esperanto, Turkish, English, German
- Standard: ECMA-94:1986, ISO/IEC 8859
- Succeeded by: ISO/IEC 8859-9 (for Turkish use)

ISO/IEC 8859-3:1999, Information technology — 8-bit single-byte coded graphic character sets — Part 3: Latin alphabet No. 3, is part of the ISO/IEC 8859 series of ASCII-based standard character encodings, first edition published in 1988. It is informally referred to as Latin-3 or South European. It was designed to cover Turkish, Maltese and Esperanto, though the introduction of ISO/IEC 8859-9 superseded it for Turkish. The encoding was popular for users of Esperanto, but fell out of use as application support for Unicode became more common.

ISO-8859-3 is the IANA preferred charset name for this standard when supplemented with the C0 and C1 control codes from ISO/IEC 6429. Microsoft has assigned code page 28593 a.k.a. Windows-28593 to ISO-8859-3 in Windows. IBM has assigned code page 913 (CCSID 913) to ISO 8859-3.

== Code page layout ==
Differences from ISO-8859-1 are shown with their Unicode code point below.

ISO/IEC 8859-3
	0	1	2	3	4	5	6	7	8	9	A	B	C	D	E	F
0x																
1x																
2x	SP	!	"	#	$	%	&	'	(	)	*	+	,	-	.	/
3x	0	1	2	3	4	5	6	7	8	9	:	;	<	=	>	?
4x	@	A	B	C	D	E	F	G	H	I	J	K	L	M	N	O
5x	P	Q	R	S	T	U	V	W	X	Y	Z	[	\	]		_
6x	`	a	b	c	d	e	f	g	h	i	j	k	l	m	n	o
7x	p	q	r	s	t	u	v	w	x	y	z	{	|	}	~	
8x																
9x																
Ax	NBSP	Ħ 0126	˘ 02D8	£	¤		Ĥ 0124	§	¨	İ 0130	Ş 015E	Ğ 011E	Ĵ 0134	SHY		Ż 017B
Bx	°	ħ 0127	²	³	´	µ	ĥ 0125	·	¸	ı 0131	ş 015F	ğ 011F	ĵ 0135	½		ż 017C
Cx	À	Á	Â		Ä	Ċ 010A	Ĉ 0108	Ç	È	É	Ê	Ë	Ì	Í	Î	Ï
Dx		Ñ	Ò	Ó	Ô	Ġ 0120	Ö	×	Ĝ 011C	Ù	Ú	Û	Ü	Ŭ 016C	Ŝ 015C	ß
Ex	à	á	â		ä	ċ 010B	ĉ 0109	ç	è	é	ê	ë	ì	í	î	ï
Fx		ñ	ò	ó	ô	ġ 0121	ö	÷	ĝ 011D	ù	ú	û	ü	ŭ 016D	ŝ 015D	˙ 02D9

== See also ==
- Mac OS Maltese/Esperanto encoding
