= 1970 in Australian literature =

This article presents a list of the historical events and publications of Australian literature during 1970.

== Major publications ==
=== Books ===
- Jessica Anderson – The Last Man's Head
- Jon Cleary – Helga's Web
- Geoffrey Dutton – Tamara
- Catherine Gaskin – Fiona
- Shirley Hazzard – The Bay of Noon
- Barry Oakley – A Salute to the Great McCarthy
- Dal Stivens – A Horse of Air
- Colin Thiele – Labourers in the Vineyard
- Patrick White – The Vivisector

=== Short stories ===
- Murray Bail – "Paradise"
- Alexandra Hasluck – Of Ladies Dead : Stories Not in the Modern Manner
- Frank Moorhouse – "The Coca-Cola Kid"
- Hal Porter – Mr Butterfry and Other Tales of New Japan

=== Children's and Young Adult fiction ===
- Hesba Brinsmead – Listen to the Wind
- Mavis Thorpe Clark – Iron Mountain
- Max Fatchen – Conquest of the River
- Lilith Norman – Climb a Lonely Hill
- Ruth Park
  - The Muddle-Headed Wombat in the Springtime
  - The Muddle-Headed Wombat on the River
- Joan Phipson – The Haunted Night
- Ivan Southall
  - Bread and Honey
  - Chinaman's Reef is Ours

=== Science fiction and fantasy ===
- Damien Broderick – Sorcerer's World
- A. Bertram Chandler – "The Bitter Pill"
- Michael Wilding – "The Man of Slow Feeling"

=== Poetry ===
- Jack Davis – The First-Born and Other Poems
- Bruce Dawe – "Weapons Training"
- Michael Dransfield – "Fix"
- Brian Elliott and Adrian Mitchell – Bards in the Wilderness : Australian Colonial Poetry to 1920 (edited)
- Robert Gray – "Journey : The North Coast"
- Rodney Hall – Heaven, in a Way
- A. D. Hope – Dunciad Minor
- David Malouf – Bicycle and Other Poems
- Peter Porter – The Last of England
- David Rowbotham – The Makers of the Ark : Poems
- Kath Walker – My People : A Kath Walker Collection

=== Drama ===
- Michael Boddy & Bob Ellis – The Legend of King O'Malley
- David Williamson
  - The Coming of Stork
  - You've Got to Get on Jack

=== Non-fiction ===
- Germaine Greer – The Female Eunuch

== Awards and honours ==
=== Literary ===
Award	Author	Title	Publisher
ALS Gold Medal	Manning Clark		
Colin Roderick Award	Margaret Lawrie	Myths and Legends of Torres Strait	University of Queensland Press
Miles Franklin Award	Dal Stivens	A Horse of Air	Angus and Robertson

=== Children and Young Adult ===
Award	Category	Author	Title	Publisher
Children's Book of the Year Award	Older Readers	Annette Macarthur-Onslow	Uhu	Ure Smith
Children's Book of the Year Award	Picture Book	No award		

=== Science fiction and fantasy ===
Award	Category	Author	Title	Publisher
Australian SF Achievement Award	Best Australian Science Fiction	Lee Harding	"Dancing Gerontius"	

=== Poetry ===
Award	Author	Title	Publisher
Grace Leven Prize for Poetry	Bruce Beaver	Letters to Live Poets	South Head Press

== Births ==
A list, ordered by date of birth (and, if the date is either unspecified or repeated, ordered alphabetically by surname) of births in 1970 of Australian literary figures, authors of written works or literature-related individuals follows, including year of death.

- 22 February – Bradley Trevor Greive, children's writer and television screenwriter
- 8 June – Paul Haines, short story writer (born in New Zealand)(died 2012)

Unknown date

- Lee Battersby, novelist and short story writer (born in Nottingham, England)
- Julia Leigh, novelist and script writer
- Martin Livings, short story writer
- Caroline Overington, novelist and journalist

== Deaths ==
A list, ordered by date of death (and, if the date is either unspecified or repeated, ordered alphabetically by surname) of deaths in 1970 of Australian literary figures, authors of written works or literature-related individuals follows, including year of birth.

- 20 April — Ronald Campbell, novelist and short story writer (born 1896)
- 1 May – Nan Chauncy, writer for children (born 1900)
- 24 May – Frank Dalby Davison, novelist and short story writer (born 1893)
- 22 July – George Johnston, novelist (born 1912)
- 30 July – Walter Murdoch, academic and essayist (born 1874)

== See also ==
- 1970 in Australia
- 1970 in literature
- 1970 in poetry
- List of years in Australian literature
- List of years in literature
