= Jimmy Brockett =

1951 novel by Dal Stivens

- First edition
- Author: Dal Stivens
- Language: English
- Genre: Fiction
- Publisher: Britannicus Liber, London
- Publication date: 1951
- Publication place: Australia
- Media type: Print
- Pages: 312 pp
- Preceded by: –
- Followed by: The Wide Arch

Jimmy Brockett : Portrait of a Notable Australian (1951) is the debut novel by Australian writer Dal Stivens.

== Story outline ==
Jimmy Brockett is a backstreets entrepreneur who builds a fortune from racing, boxing and newspapers. Brockett joins the Labour Party in Sydney and the novel follows his political career as he rises to become a successful businessman and a Member of Parliament.

== Critical reception ==
Geoffrey Hutton in The Argus noted some highlights of the book: "Mr Stivens writes in what may already be called the Sydney tradition, which is distinct from anything you might expect from Adelaide, Perth, or Brisbane. In its toughness it has links with the bushranger novel but its back country is the slums of Woolloomooloo or Surry Hills; and its bandits don't stick up mail coaches but run wrestling matches and get into Parliament. Jimmy Brockett does both, for Jimmy is an urban Ned Kelly, who holds up the city suckers and lifts their bullion without needing firearms. Jimmy is big and brash, like Sydney, and he narrates his story largely in the third person like Caesar."

Reviewing the novel for Westerly in 1984, Van Ikin compared the book to Power Without Glory by Frank Hardy, published the year before: "As the difference between the two novels' titles implies, Hardy is writing primarily to advance a thesis whereas Stivens' focus falls upon the human individual (though with sufficient structural apparatus to place that individual within a wider perspective)."

== See also ==
- 1951 in Australian literature

== Notes ==
- Dedication: To Win, who has had to live with both of us
- The novel was originally published in London, as Stivens was living there at the time, but was held up by Customs on its arrival in Australia. No reason was given but the novel was subsequently released for sale.
