= Dictionary order =

Dictionary order may refer to:

- Alphabetical order § Treatment of multiword strings
- Other collation systems used to order words in dictionaries
- Lexicographic order in mathematics
