= Ge with inverted breve =

Cyrillic letter formerly used for /ʁ/ in Aleut

- Г̑ г̑

Usage
- Writing system: Cyrillic
- Type: Alphabetic
- Sound values: [ɣ], [ʁ]

Ge with inverted breve (Г̑ г̑; italics: Г̑ г̑) is a letter of the Cyrillic script.

Ge with inverted breve was used in the historical alphabet of the Aleut language, where it represented the voiced uvular fricative /ʁ/, like the r in French ‘rouge’. It corresponds to Latin letter G with circumflex (Ĝ ĝ Ĝ ĝ).

== See also ==
- Cyrillic characters in Unicode
