= Mac OS Maltese/Esperanto encoding =

Apple computer text character encoding

Mac OS Maltese/Esperanto
- Languages: Esperanto, Turkish, Maltese
- Created by: Evertype
- Classification: Extended ASCII
- Extends: US-ASCII
- Based on: Mac OS Turkish

Mac OS Maltese/Esperanto, called MacOS Esperanto in older sources, is a character encoding for Esperanto, Maltese and Turkish created by Michael Everson on August 15, 1997, based on the Mac OS Turkish encoding. It is used in his fonts, but not on official Mac OS fonts.

ISO/IEC 8859-3 supports the same languages with a different layout.

== Layout ==
Each character is shown with its equivalent Unicode code point. Only the second half of the table (code points 128–255) is shown, the first half (code points 0–127) being the same as ASCII.

Mac OS Maltese/Esperanto
	0	1	2	3	4	5	6	7	8	9	A	B	C	D	E	F
8x	Ä	Å	Ç	É	Ñ	Ö	Ü	á	à	â	ä	ã	å	ç	é	è
9x	ê	ë	í	ì	î	ï	ñ	ó	ò	ô	ö	õ	ú	ù	û	ü
Ax	†	°	¢	£	§	•	¶	ß	®	©	™	´	¨	≠	Æ	Ø
Bx	Ĉ	±	≤	≥	ĉ	μ	Ĝ	ĝ	Ĥ	ĥ	Ĵ	ĵ	Ŝ	ŝ	æ	ø
Cx	Ŭ	ŭ	¬	Ċ	ƒ	ċ	Ġ	«	»	…	NBSP	À	Ã	Õ	Œ	œ
Dx	–	—	“	”	‘	’	÷	◊	ÿ	Ÿ	Ğ	ğ	İ	ı	Ş	ş
Ex	‡	·	‚	„	‰	Â	Ê	Á	Ë	È	Í	Î	Ï	Ì	Ó	Ô
Fx	ġ	Ò	Ú	Û	Ù	€^{¤}	ˆ	˜	Ħ	˘	˙	Ż	¸	ż	ħ	ˇ

Differences from Mac OS Turkish encoding
- ^¤ Previously the character 0xF5 mapped to currency sign (¤), Unicode character U+00A4.
