= A Horse of Air =

1970 novel by Dal Stivens

- First edition
- Author: Dal Stivens
- Language: English
- Genre: Novel
- Publisher: Angus and Robertson, Australia
- Publication date: 1970
- Publication place: Australia
- Media type: Print (Hardback & Paperback)
- Pages: 222 pp
- ISBN: 0207121168
- Preceded by: Three Persons Make a Tiger
- Followed by: The Bushranger

A Horse of Air (1970) is a Miles Franklin Award-winning novel by Australian author Dal Stivens.

== Story outline ==
The horse of the title is said to make reference to the Australian Aboriginal term for the night parrot. When horses where first introduced to the Australian mainland, their galloping motion was said to resemble the flight of the now critically endangered low-flying parrot. Stivens was himself a keen ornithologist who favoured finches over parrots. However, the phrase is taken from a 17th-century 'mad song' called Tom o'Bedlam.<Hickman L (1971) I get obsessed. The Australian Women's Weekly 21 July 1971, p. 65. >

The novel centres on the ravings of its chief narrator, Harry Craddock. Harry uses his wealth and influence in elite circles to organise a search for the elusive bird. But his discontent with mainstream Australian society is clear. On p. 67, for example, he proclaims: "Australians are a nation of nobodies and ning-nongs – we deserve every ounce of the continent's indifference!"

The novel advocates a return to the colonial visions of Ernest Giles, who sought to open up the heart of the continent for industrial development, including uranium mining. Giles sees opportunity in the "Valleys of Palms" that spring from the Simpson Desert. The novel, originally hailed as a modern classic when it received the Miles Franklin Award in 1971, quickly slipped into obscurity. The only reprint was offered in 1986 by Penguin Books, with original cover art by Australian Artist, Brett Whitely.

== Critical reception ==
In The Bulletin David Ball found much to like about the novel, but felt it didn't quite hit its mark: "...the book does have enthusiasm, and a little of humor and reverence both. It's a trip into the outback I don't expect I shall make myself. I enjoyed reading it. And so I take leave sadly of Moby Dinkum – but without saying goodbye. The quest became one, too, for whatever remained of an earlier explorer, Alfred Gibson., But this more humanistic search is as empty and betrayed – and he must have another go. She'll be right next time, perhaps mate."

Maurice Vintner in The Sydney Morning Herald noted a lot of depth in the book: "It could be a subtle psychological study, but it is both more and less than this; it could be a superior piece of natural history, but it is more than this. It could be an allegory for our times: the allegories are there for the prospectors to find. It could be a lively farce, full of laughs; there are certainly some notable pieces of comic writing, but as the garnish rather than the substance. The best estimate, perhaps is that all these elements are here in some degree for the reader to enjoy, as the author obviously enjoyed writing them."

Reviewing a re-issue of the novel in 1986 in The Canberra Times Veronica Sen noted: "This stimulating novel, using myths of the great Australian emptiness, both spiritual and physical, as its underpinning, oscillates between boyish glee and disillusionment as it looks at relationships - and our society – with both wit and compassion."

== See also ==
- 1970 in Australian literature

== Notes ==
Epigraph: with an host of furious fancies whereof I am commaunder, with a burning speare, & a horse of aire, to the wildernesse I wander. By a knight of ghostes & shadowes, I sumon'd am to Tourney. ten leagues beyond the wide worlds end mee thinke it is noe journey. yet will I sing, & c: Mad Tom o' Bedlam's Ballad (Anon.)

Of the gladdest moments in human life, methinks, is the departure upon a distant journey into unknown lands. Shaking off with one mighty effort the fetters of habit, the leaden weight of Routine, the cloak of many Cares and the slavery of Home, man feels once more happy. The blood flows with the fast circulation of childhood ... Afresh dawns the morn of life ... - Richard Burton, Journal entry, 2 December 1856.

Our lives were wild, romantic, and solemn. - Isabel Burton, on their stay in Damascus.

To know how to free oneself is nothing; the arduous thing is to know what to do with one's freedom. - Andre Gide, The Immoralist

I have been cunning in mine overthrow, The careful pilot of my proper woe.- Byron
