= Esperanto orthography =

Orthography of the Esperanto language

Esperanto is written in a Latin-script alphabet of twenty-eight letters, with upper and lower case. This is supplemented by punctuation marks and by various logograms, such as the digits 0–9, currency signs such as $ € ¥ £ ₷, and mathematical symbols. The creator of Esperanto, L. L. Zamenhof, declared a principle of "one letter, one sound", though this is a general rather than strict guideline.

Twenty-two of the letters are identical in form to letters of the English alphabet (q, w, x, and y being omitted). The remaining six have diacritical marks: ĉ, ĝ, ĥ, ĵ, ŝ, and ŭ – that is, c, g, h, j, and s circumflex, and u breve.

== Standard alphabet ==
Standard Esperanto orthography uses the Latin script.

=== Phonology ===
The letters have approximately the sound values of the IPA, with the exception of c [t͡s] and the letters with diacritics: ĉ [t͡ʃ], ĝ [d͡ʒ], ĥ [x], ĵ [ʒ], ŝ [ʃ], ŭ [u̯]. J transcribes two sounds, consonantal [j] (the English y sound, as in you) and vocalic [i̯].

Majuscule forms (also called uppercase or capital letters)
A	B	C	Ĉ	D	E	F	G	Ĝ	H	Ĥ	I	J		Ĵ	K	L	M	N	O	P	R	S	Ŝ	T	U	Ŭ	V	Z
Minuscule forms (also called lowercase or small letters)
a	b	c	ĉ	d	e	f	g	ĝ	h	ĥ	i	j		ĵ	k	l	m	n	o	p	r	s	ŝ	t	u	ŭ	v	z
Principal IPA values (Note: Disregarding voicing assimilation of obstruents)
a	b	t͜s	t͜ʃ	d	e	f	ɡ	d͜ʒ	h	x	i	i̯	j	ʒ	k	l	m	n	o	p	r	s	ʃ	t	u	u̯	v	z

There is a nearly one-to-one correspondence of letter to sound. Diphthongs such as aŭ and eŭ require two letters. ⟨J⟩ has dual consonantal and vocalic use, parallel to Esperanto having both consonantal ⟨v⟩ and vocalic ⟨ŭ⟩. For those who consider /d͜z/ to be a phoneme, Esperanto contains one consonantal digraph as well, ⟨dz⟩. Allophony has been noted in the vowels (for example in open vs closed syllables) and is found in the place assimilation of /m/ and /n/, the latter of which for example is frequently pronounced [ŋ] before g and k for speakers of language backgrounds that do the same.

Phonemic change is perhaps limited to voicing assimilation of obstruents, as in the sequence kz of ekzemplo, ('(an) example') which is 'inevitably' pronounced /ɡz/ in normal speech, though purists try to pronounce it /kz/. In Zamenhof's writing, obstruents with different voicing such as k and z do not meet in compound lexical words, but rather are separated by an epenthetic vowel, such as o, to avoid such assimilation, though placing such letters together is common among speakers whose language background allows it.

Non-Esperantized names are given an Esperanto approximation of their original pronunciation, at least by speakers without command of the original language. Hard ⟨c⟩ is read as k, ⟨qu⟩ as kv, ⟨w⟩ as v, ⟨x⟩ as ks, and ⟨y⟩ as j if a consonant, or as i if a vowel. The English digraph ⟨th⟩ is read as t. When there is no close equivalent, the difficult sounds may be given the Esperanto values of the letters in the orthography or roman transcription, accommodating the constraints of Esperanto phonology. So, for example, Winchester (the English city) is pronounced (and may be spelled) Vinĉester /vint͜ʃester/, as Esperanto ŭ does not occur at the beginning of ordinary words. Changzhou generally becomes Ĉanĝo /t͜ʃand͜ʒo/, as Esperanto has no ng or ou sound. There are no strict rules, however; speakers may try for greater fidelity, for example by pronouncing the g and u in Changzhou: Ĉangĝoŭ /t͜ʃaŋɡd͜ʒou̯/ (despite there being no g sound in the Chinese pronunciation). The original stress may be kept, if it is known.

=== Capitalization ===
Capitalization is used for the first word of a sentence and for proper names when used as nouns. Names of months, days of the week, ethnicities, languages, and the adjectival forms of proper names are not typically capitalized (anglo "an Englishman", angla "English", usona "US American"), though national norms may override such generalizations. Titles are more variable: both the Romance style of capitalizing only the first word of the title and the English style of capitalizing all lexical words are found.

All capitals or small capitals are used for acronyms and initialisms of proper names, like TEJO, but not common expressions like ktp (etc.). Small capitals are also a common convention for family names, to avoid the confusion of varying national naming conventions: Kalocsay Kálmán, Leslie Cheung Kwok-wing.

Camel case, with or without a hyphen, may occur when a prefix is added to a proper noun: la geZamenhofoj (the Zamenhofs), pra-Esperanto (Proto-Esperanto). It is also used for Russian-style syllabic acronyms, such as the name ReVo for Reta Vortaro ("Internet Dictionary"), which is homonymous with revo (dream). Occasionally mixed capitalization will be used for orthographic puns, such as espERAnto, which stands for the esperanta radikala asocio (Radical Esperanto Association).

Zamenhof contrasted informal ci with formal, and capitalized, Vi as the second-person singular pronouns. However, lower-case vi is now used as the second-person pronoun regardless of number.

=== Alphabet letter names ===
==== Standard names ====
For consonants, Zamenhof simply added -o onto the end to create the name of the letter, while the vowels represent themselves: a, bo, co, ĉo, do, e, fo, etc. The diacritics are frequently mentioned overtly. For instance, ĉ may be called ĉo ĉapelita, from ĉapelo (a hat), and ŭ may be called u hoketa, from hoko (a hook) plus the diminutive -et-. This is the only system that is widely accepted and in practical use.

The letters of the ISO basic Latin alphabet not found in the Esperanto alphabet have distinct names, much as letters of the Greek alphabet do. ⟨q⟩, ⟨x⟩, ⟨y⟩ are kuo, ikso, ipsilono; ⟨w⟩ has been called duobla vo (double V), vavo (using Waringhien's name of va below), vuo (proposed by Sergio Pokrovskij), germana vo (German V), and ĝermana vo (Germanic V).

However, while this is fine for initialisms such as ktp [kotopo] for etc., it can be problematic when spelling out names. For example, several consonantal distinctions are difficult for many nationalities, who normally rely on the fact that Esperanto seldom uses these sounds to distinguish words (that is, they do not form many minimal pairs). Thus the pairs of letter names ĵo–ĝo, ĥo–ho (or ĥo–ko), co–ĉo (or co–so, co–to), lo–ro, and ŭo–vo (or vo–bo) are problematic. In addition, over a noisy telephone connection, it quickly becomes apparent that voicing distinctions can be difficult to make out: noise confounds the pairs po–bo, to–do, ĉo–ĝo, ko–go, fo–vo, so–zo, ŝo–ĵo, as well as the nasals mo–no.

There have been several proposals to resolve this problem. Gaston Waringhien proposed changing the vowel of voiced obstruents to a, so that at least voicing is not problematic. Also changed to a are h, n, r, distinguishing them from ĥ, m, l. The result is perhaps the most common alternative in use:

a, ba, co, ĉo, da, e, fo, ga, ĝa, ha, ĥo, i, jo, ĵa, ko, lo, mo, na, o, po, ra, so, ŝo, to, u, ŭo, va, za

However, this still requires overt mention of the diacritics, and even so does not reliably distinguish ba–va, co–so, ĉo–ŝo, or ĝa–ĵa.

The proposal closest to international norms (and thus the easiest to remember) that clarifies all the above distinctions is a modification of a proposal by Kálmán Kalocsay. As with Zamenhof, vowels stand for themselves, but it follows the international standard of placing vowel e after a consonant by default (be, ce, de, ge), but before sonorants (el, en) and voiceless fricatives (ef, es). The vowel a is used for ⟨h⟩ and the voiceless plosives ⟨p⟩, ⟨t⟩, ⟨k⟩, after the international names ha for ⟨h⟩ and ka for ⟨k⟩; the French name ĵi is used for ⟨ĵ⟩, the Greek name ĥi (chi) for ⟨ĥ⟩, and the English name ar for ⟨r⟩. The letter ⟨v⟩ has the i vowel of ĵi, distinguishing it from ⟨b⟩, but the other voiced fricative, ⟨z⟩, does not, to avoid the problem of it palatalizing and being confused with ĵi. The diphthong offglide ⟨ŭ⟩ is named eŭ, the only real possibility given Esperanto phonotactics besides aŭ, which, as the word for "or", could cause confusion. The letter ⟨m⟩ is called om to distinguish it from ⟨n⟩; the vowel o alliterates well in the alphabetical sequence el, om, en, o, pa. There are other patterns to the vowels in the ABC rhyme: The lines start with a i a i and finish with a a e e. The letters with diacritics are placed at the end of the rhyme, taking the place of w, x, y in other Latin alphabets, so as not to disrupt the pattern of letters many people learned as children. All this makes the system more easily memorized than competing proposals. The modified Kalocsay abecedary is:

a, be, ce, de, e, ef, ge, ha,
i, je, ka, el, om, en, o, pa,
ar, es, ta, u, vi, ĉa, ĝe,
ĥi kaj ĵi, eŝ, eŭ kaj ze,
plus ku', ikso, ipsilono,
jen la abece-kolono.

(kaj means "and". The last line reads: here is the ABC column)

Where letters are still confused, such as es vs eŝ or a vs ha, mention can be made of the diacritic (eŝ ĉapela), or to the manner of articulation of the sound (ha brueta "breathy aitch"). Quite commonly, however, people will use the aitch as in house strategy used in English.

==== Spelling alphabets ====
Another strategy is to use a spelling alphabet (literuma alfabeto), which substitutes ordinary words for letters. The following words are sometimes seen:

From a German–Esperanto dictionary by Erich-Dieter Krause:

Asfalto, Barbaro, Centimetro, Ĉefo, Doktoro, Elemento, Fabriko, Gumo, Ĝirafo, Hotelo, Ĥaoso, Insekto, Jubileo, Ĵurnalo, Kilogramo, Legendo, Maŝino, Naturo, Oktobro, Papero, Kuo, Rekordo, Salato, Ŝilingo, Triumfo, Universo, Universo-hoketo, Vulkano, Ĝermana vo, Ikso, Ipsilono, Zinko (Note: A few of these words may be difficult to distinguish from other Esperanto words in noisy conditions, such as gumo – kubo, naturo – maturo – daturo, maŝino – baseno, vulkano – bulgaro, and zinko – ŝinko, and so may not be easily recognizable if the system is not known.)

A proposal by Simon Edward Adrian Payne in Monato:

akvo, baldaŭ, cedro, ĉirkaŭ, dolĉa, eĥo, fajfi, golfo, ĝis, hejme, ĥoro, iĝi, jaĥto, ĵuri, korpo, lingvo, morgaŭ, nokto, ofte, pelvo, kuo, riĉa, sankta, ŝaŭmi, tempo, uzi, ŭa-ŭa, vespo, vavo, ikso, ipsilono, zorgi (Note: A few of these words may also be difficult to distinguish from other Esperanto words or, in the cases of golfo and korpo, also ŭa-ŭa and vavo, even from each other.)

A proposal by Gerrit François Makkink, in which most words are tetrasyllabic so that the syllable beginning with the letter in question receives secondary stress (though only in Varsovio do both stressed syllables begin with the letter):

Akademio, bondeziro, centjariĝo, Ĉe-metodo, delegito, Esperanto, Fundamento, gramatiko, ĝisrevido, harmonio, ĥorkantado, internacia, jubileo, ĵurnalisto, kalendaro, Ludoviko, modernigo, necesejo, okupita, propagando, kuo, redaktoro, sekretario, ŝatokupo, telefono, universala, u-supersigno, Varsovio, vuo, ikso, ipsilono, Zamenhofo

The International League of Esperantist Radio Amateurs (ILERA) uses the following adaptation of the International Radiotelephony Spelling Alphabet (ICAO and NATO "phonetic" alphabet):

alfa, bravo, carli, delta, eko, fokstrot, golf, hotel, india, juliet, kilo, lima, majk, november, oskar, papa, kebek, romeo, siera, tango, uniform, viktor, ŭiski ~ viski, eksrej, janki, zulu

ILERA also modifies the numerals ses '6' and sep '7' to sis and sepen to make them more distinct, and uses the nominal form nulo for zero.

=== Origin ===
The script resembles Western Slavic Latin alphabets but uses circumflexes instead of carons for the letters ĉ, ĝ, ĥ, ĵ, and ŝ. Also, the non-Slavic bases of the letters ĝ and ĵ, rather than Slavic dž and ž, help preserve the printed appearance of Latinate and Germanic vocabulary such as ĝenerala "general" (adjective) and ĵurnalo "journal". The letter v stands for either v or w of other languages. The letter ŭ of the diphthongs aŭ and eŭ resemble the Belarusian Łacinka alphabet.

Zamenhof took advantage of the fact that typewriters for the French language (which, in his lifetime, served as an international lingua franca for educated people) possess a dead key for the circumflex diacritic: thus, anyone with access to a French typewriter could type ĉ ĝ ĥ ĵ ŝ and their uppercase counterparts with no problem. French typewriters also include the letter ⟨ù⟩, which Francophone Esperantists have long used as a substitute for Esperanto ŭ. With the advent of personal computers, French-language keyboards still possess a dead-key ^, but whether it can be used to type Esperanto consonants may depend on the underlying software. Zamenhof's choice of accented letters was familiar to the speakers of some Slavic languages, for instance, Czech and Slovak, where the sounds of Esperanto ĉ and ŝ are represented by the letters č and š, respectively; and Belarusian, because Esperanto ŭ bears the same relation to u as Belarusian Cyrillic ў bears to у.

Geographic names may diverge from English spelling, especially for the letters x, w, qu and gu, as in Vaŝintono "Washington, D.C.", Meksiko "Mexico City", and Gvatemalo "Guatemala". Other spelling differences appear when Esperanto words are based on the pronunciation rather than the spelling of English place names, such as Brajtono for Brighton.

=== Variations ===
==== Alternative diacritics ====
Since all letters with diacritics are unique, (Note: There are no letters that are only differentiated by their diacritical marks, as opposed to, e.g. French è and é.) they are often simplified in handwriting. The most common diacritic to be simplified is the circumflex, which often appears more like a macron or acute accent (e.g. ḡ or ǵ instead of ĝ).

==== ASCII transliteration ====
There are two common conventions for inputting and typesetting Esperanto in the ISO basic Latin alphabet when proper orthography is inconvenient. Zamenhof had suggested replacing the circumflex letters with digraphs in h, the so-called "h-system", thus: ch, gh, hh, jh, sh for ĉ, ĝ, ĥ, ĵ, ŝ and u for ŭ, with an apostrophe or hyphen to disambiguate actual sequences of these letters (e.g. ses-hora). With the advent of computer word-processing, the so-called "x-system", with digraphs in x for all diacritics, has become equally popular: cx, gx, hx, jx, sx, ux. The words ŝanĝi "to change" and ĵaŭde "on Thursday" are written shanghi, jhaude and sxangxi, jxauxde, respectively, in the two systems. The h-system has a more conventional appearance, but because the letter x does not occur in Esperanto, it is fairly straightforward to automatically convert text written in the x-system into standard orthography; it also produces better results with alphabetic sorting.

=== Computer input ===
The Esperanto alphabet is part of the Latin-3 and Unicode character sets, and is included in WGL4. The code points and HTML entities for the Esperanto characters with diacritics and the spesmilo sign are:

Glyph	Codepoint	Name	HTML entities
Ĉ	U+0108	Latin capital letter c with circumflex	&Ccirc;, &#x108;, &#264;
ĉ	U+0109	Latin small letter c with circumflex	&ccirc;, &#x109;, &#265;
Ĝ	U+011C	Latin capital letter g with circumflex	&Gcirc;, &#x11C;, &#284;
ĝ	U+011D	Latin small letter g with circumflex	&gcirc;, &#x11D;, &#285;
Ĥ	U+0124	Latin capital letter h with circumflex	&Hcirc;, &#x124;, &#292;
ĥ	U+0125	Latin small letter h with circumflex	&hcirc;, &#x125;, &#293;
Ĵ	U+0134	Latin capital letter j with circumflex	&Jcirc;, &#x134;, &#308;
ĵ	U+0135	Latin small letter j with circumflex	&jcirc;, &#x135;, &#309;
Ŝ	U+015C	Latin capital letter s with circumflex	&Scirc;, &#x15C;, &#348;
ŝ	U+015D	Latin small letter s with circumflex	&scirc;, &#x15D;, &#349;
Ŭ	U+016C	Latin capital letter u with breve	&Ubreve;, &#x16C;, &#364;
ŭ	U+016D	Latin small letter u with breve	&ubreve;, &#x16D;, &#365;
₷	U+20B7	Spesmilo sign	&#x20B7;, &#8375;

== Punctuation ==
As with most languages, punctuation is not completely standardized, but in Esperanto there is the additional complication of multiple competing national traditions.

Commas are frequently used to introduce subordinate clauses (that is, before ke "that" or the ki- correlatives):

Mi ne scias, kiel fari tion. (I don't know how to do that.)

The comma is also used for the decimal point, while thousands are separated by non-breaking spaces: 12345678,9, or sometimes by apostrophes: Li enspezis $3'300'000.

The question mark (?) and the exclamation mark (!) are used at the end of a clause and may be internal to a sentence. Question words generally come at the beginning of a question, obviating the need for Spanish-style inverted question marks.

Periods may be used to indicate initialisms: k.t.p. or ktp for kaj tiel plu (et cetera), but not abbreviations that retain the grammatical suffixes. Instead, a hyphen optionally replaces the missing letters: D-ro or Dro for Doktoro (Dr). With ordinal numerals, the adjectival a and accusative n may be superscripted: 13a or 13^{a} (13th). The abbreviation k is used without a period for kaj (and); the ampersand (&) is not found. Roman numerals are also avoided.

The hyphen is also occasionally used to clarify compounds, and to join grammatical suffixes to proper names that haven't been Esperantized or don't have a nominal -o suffix, such as the accusative on Kalocsay-n or Kálmán-on. The proximate particle ĉi used with correlatives, such as ĉi tiu 'this one' and ĉi tie 'here', may be poetically used with nouns and verbs as well (ĉi jaro 'this year', esti ĉi 'to be here'), but if these phrases are then changed to adjectives or adverbs, a hyphen is used: ĉi-jare 'this year', ĉi-landa birdo 'a bird of this land'.

Quotation marks show the greatest variety of any punctuation. The use of Esperanto quotation marks was never stated in Zamenhof's work; it was assumed that a printer would use whatever was available, usually the national standard of the printer's country. Em dashes (—...), guillemets («...» or reversed »...«), double quote marks (“...” and German-style „...“) and more are all found. Since the age of word-processing, however, American-style quotation marks are the most widespread. Quotations may be introduced with either a comma or a colon.

Time and date format is not standardized among Esperantists, but internationally unambiguous formats such as 1970-01-01 (ISO) or 1-jan-1970 are preferred when the date is not spelled out in full ("la 1-a de januaro 1970").

== Spesmilo symbol ==
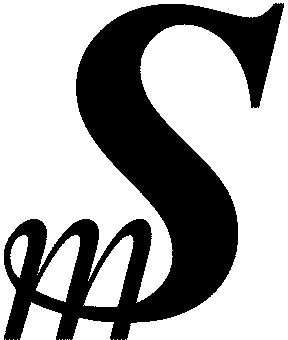
The Sm sign

Unique to the Esperanto script is the spesmilo (1000 specie) sign, ⟨₷⟩, an Sm monogram for an obsolete international unit of auxiliary Esperanto currency used by a few British and Swiss banks before World War I. It is often transcribed as Sm, usually italic.

== Other scripts ==
=== Cyrillic ===
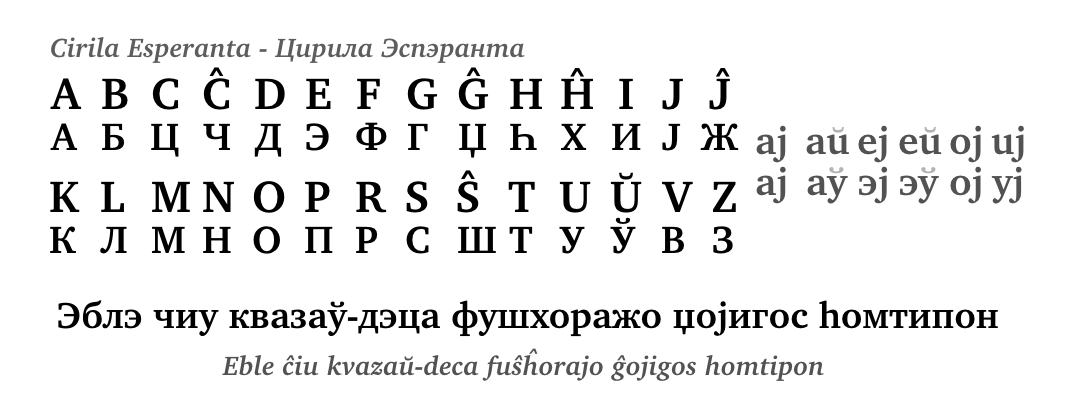
The Cyrillic Esperanto Alphabet and pangram Eble ĉiu kvazaŭ-deca fuŝĥoraĵo ĝojigos homtipon. (Maybe every quasi-fitting bungle-choir makes a human type happy.)

The Cyrillic script has also been adapted to write Esperanto. It mainly occurred during the 20th century, in the USSR, when Roman-alphabet typewriters were hardly available.

=== Shavian ===
The Shavian alphabet adapted to write Esperanto: alphabet and ligatures

The Shavian alphabet, which was designed for English, was modified for use with Esperanto by John Wesley Starling. Though not widely used, at least one booklet has been published with sample Shavian texts. Not all letters are equivalent to their English values, and special forms of the letters ⟨n⟩ and ⟨s⟩ have been added for the accusative case ending and verbal inflections; the grammatical endings and the words la 'the', aŭ 'or' and kaj 'and' are written as ligatures.

The vowels necessarily differ from English. Esperanto a e i o u take the letters for English /æ ɛ ɪ ə ɒ/, with more regard to graphic symmetry than phonetic faithfulness in the cases of o and u. C takes the letter for /θ/, the Castilian value of c before e and i, and ĥ that for /ŋ/, the inverse of the letter for /h/. (Note: Shaw's use of inverted ⟨h⟩ for ⟨ŋ⟩ was a phonetic joke, as English /h/ and /ŋ/ are in complementary distribution.) The most divergent letters are those for m and n, which are /ʊ uː/ in English, but which are graphically better suited to be distinct letters than English Shavian /m n/.

=== Fingerspelling ===
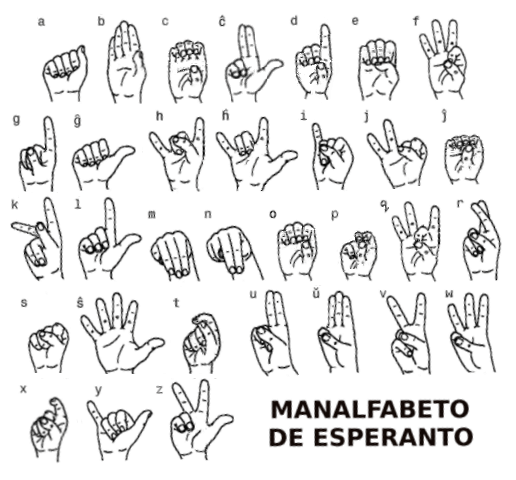
Signuno alphabet

There is a proposed manual alphabet as part of the Signuno project. Signuno, as a signed variant of Esperanto, is itself a manual logographic Esperanto orthography. The majority of letters of the manual alphabet resemble those of the American manual alphabet, but also of the French manual alphabet and others. The diacritic letters Ĉ, Ĝ, Ĥ, Ĵ, Ŝ, Ŭ have their own signs, and J and Z are distinct from other alphabets, as none of the Signuno letters involve motion. Digits are formed by extending the fingers from the index to the pinkie for 1 to 4, from the pinkie to the thumb (keeping the middle finger down) for 6 to 9, and from the thumb to index for 11 and 12; the last two are used for months and hours. Zero is represented by the fist, 5 by the whole hand extended, and 10 as the letter X.

=== Braille ===
Esperanto braille alphabet
⠁ a	⠃ b	⠉ c	⠩ ĉ	⠙ d	⠑ e	⠋ f	⠛ g	⠻ ĝ	⠓ h	⠳ ĥ	⠊ i	⠚ j	⠺ ĵ	⠅ k	⠇ l
⠍ m	⠝ n	⠕ o	⠏ p	⠗ r	⠎ s	⠮ ŝ	⠞ t	⠥ u	⠬ ŭ	⠧ v	⠵ z	⠟ q	⠾ w	⠭ x	⠽ y

The Esperanto versions of braille and Morse code both include the six diacritic letters.

An Esperanto braille magazine, Aŭroro, has been published since 1920.

Esperanto Morse code
Ĉ	▄▄▄ ▄ ▄▄▄ ▄ ▄
Ĝ	▄▄▄ ▄▄▄ ▄ ▄▄▄ ▄
Ĥ	▄▄▄ ▄▄▄ ▄▄▄ ▄▄▄
Ĵ	▄ ▄▄▄ ▄▄▄ ▄▄▄ ▄
Ŝ	▄ ▄ ▄ ▄▄▄ ▄
Ŭ	▄ ▄ ▄▄▄ ▄▄▄

=== Morse code ===
In Morse code, a dot is added to C and J to derive Ĉ and Ĵ, a dash–dot is added to G and S to derive Ĝ and Ŝ, a dash is added to U to derive Ŭ, and the four dots of H are changed to four dashes for Ĥ. However, users often substitute these novel letters with digraphs ch, gh, jh, sh etc.

=== Fictional scripts ===
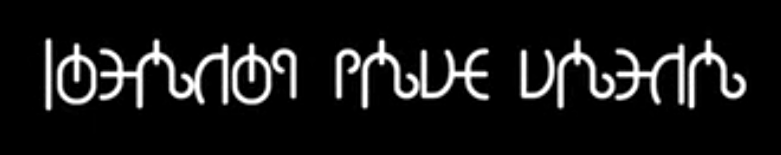
antaŭ kvar monatoj (four months ago) in the invented script from the TV series Resident Alien. Script reads right to left; u and v are not distinguished.

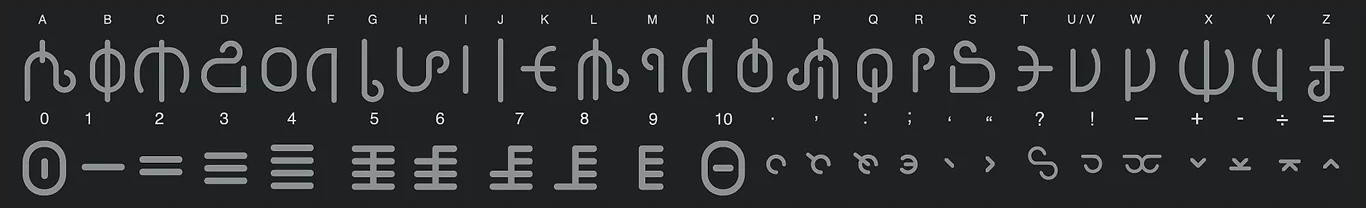
The full Resident Alien alphabet, digits and punctuation; the punctuation is displayed at reduced font size.

The US television series Resident Alien uses an invented script that does not distinguish u and v, and ignores diacritics, to transcribe Esperanto as the alien language. It is written right to left.

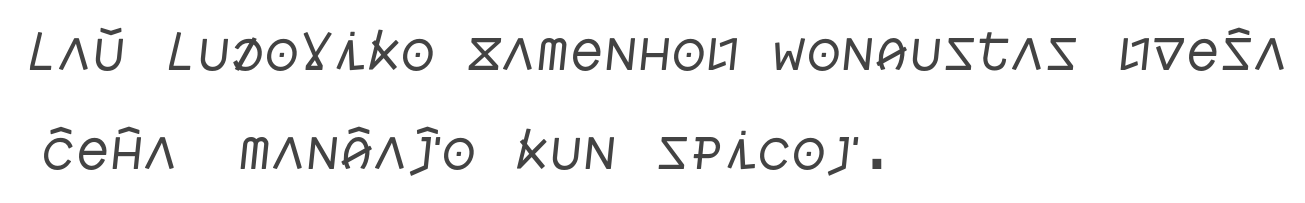
An Esperanto pangram showing Laŭ Ludoviko Zamenhof bongustas freŝa ĉeĥa manĝaĵo kun spicoj. in the Juliamo alphabet.

The 2017 Japanese-language visual novel The Expression Amrilato and its 2021 sequel Distant Memoraĵo feature a language named Juliamo that is actually Esperanto in a modified Latin alphabet.

== See also ==
- Orthography
- Ĉ, Ĝ, Ĥ, Ĵ, Ŝ, Ŭ, ₷
