= X̂ =

Latin letter X with circumflex

X with circumflex
- X̂x̂

Usage
- Type: alphabetic
- Language of origin: Aleut language, Haida language
- Sound values: [χ]
- In Unicode: U+0058 + U+0302, U+0078 + U+0302

History
Development
R11
    - Ξ
      - 𐊐
        - 𐊐
          - X x
            - X̂x̂

X̂ is the Latin letter X with a circumflex. The letter is used in the modern orthography of the Aleut language and in the current Alaska Native Language Center alphabet of the Haida language. In both cases, it represents the sound [χ].

In mathematics, x̂ often refers to the unit vector in the +X direction. In statistics, it can also represent the predicted value for x, consistent with the hat notation.

Character information
Preview	X		x		̂	
Unicode name	LATIN CAPITAL LETTER X		LATIN SMALL LETTER X		COMBINING CIRCUMFLEX	
Encodings	decimal	hex	dec	hex	dec	hex
Unicode	88	U+0058	120	U+0078	770	U+0302
UTF-8	88	58	120	78	204 130	CC 82
Numeric character reference	&#88;	&#x58;	&#120;	&#x78;	&#770;	&#x302;
