= Lessing-Othmer =

Lessing-Othmer is a romanization of Mandarin Chinese that was introduced by F. Lessing and Dr. W. Othmer, who in 1912 printed their book „Lehrgang der nordchinesischen Umgangssprache“ ("Course in the North Chinese Colloquial Language") through the „Deutsch-Chinesische Druckerei und Verlagsanstalt“ in Qingdao while it was a German colony.

In 1979, the State Council of the People's Republic of China for Romanization ruled that translations of foreign-language publications should utilize Lessing-Othmer romanization in German-speaking countries, and Pinyin in English-speaking countries.

== Table ==
The sounds romanized differently from Pinyin are highlighted in blue.

=== Initial ===
		Bilabial		Labiodental	Alveolar		Retroflex		Alveolo-palatal	Velar
		Voiceless	Voiced	Voiceless	Voiceless	Voiced	Voiceless	Voiced	Voiceless	Voiceless
Nasal			m [m] ㄇ m			n [n] ㄋ n				
Plosive	Unaspirated	b [p] ㄅ b			d [t] ㄉ d					g [k] ㄍ g
Plosive	Aspirated	p [pʰ] ㄆ p			t [tʰ] ㄊ t					k [kʰ] ㄎ k
Affricate	Unaspirated				ds [ts] ㄗ z		dsch [ʈʂ] ㄓ zh		dj [tɕ] ㄐ j	
Affricate	Aspirated				ts [tsʰ] ㄘ c		tsch [ʈʂʰ] ㄔ ch		tj [tɕʰ] ㄑ q	
Fricative				f [f] ㄈ f	s [s] ㄙ s		sch [ʂ] ㄕ sh		hs [ɕ] ㄒ x	h [x] ㄏ h
Liquid						l [l] ㄌ l		j [ɻ~ʐ] ㄖ r		

=== Finals ===
		Coda												
		∅			/i/		/u/		/n/		/ŋ/			/ɻ/
Medial	∅	ï [ɨ] ㄭ -i	ö [ɤ] ㄜ e	a [a] ㄚ a	e [ei] ㄟ ei	ai [ai] ㄞ ai	ou [ou] ㄡ ou	au [au] ㄠ ao	ën [ən] ㄣ en	an [an] ㄢ an	ung [ʊŋ] ㄨㄥ ong	ëng [əŋ] ㄥ eng	ang [aŋ] ㄤ ang	örl [aɚ] ㄦ er
Medial	/j/	i [i] ㄧ i	iä [je] ㄧㄝ ie	ia [ja] ㄧㄚ ia			iu [jou] ㄧㄡ iu	iau [jau] ㄧㄠ iao	in [in] ㄧㄣ in	iän [jɛn] ㄧㄢ ian	iung [jʊŋ] ㄩㄥ iong	ing [iŋ] ㄧㄥ ing	iang [jaŋ] ㄧㄤ iang	
Medial	/w/	u [u] ㄨ u	o [wo] ㄨㄛ uo	ua [wa] ㄨㄚ ua	ui [wei] ㄨㄟ ui	uai [wai] ㄨㄞ uai			un [wən] ㄨㄣ un	uan [wan] ㄨㄢ uan		ung [wəŋ] ㄨㄥ ueng	uang [waŋ] ㄨㄤ uang	
Medial	/ɥ/	ü [y] ㄩ ü	üä [ɥe] ㄩㄝ üe						ün [yn] ㄩㄣ ün	üan [ɥɛn] ㄩㄢ üan				
