= Dal Stivens =

Australian writer

Dallas George "Dal" Stivens (31 December 1911 – 15 June 1997) was an Australian writer who produced six novels and eight collections of short stories between 1936, when The Tramp and Other Stories was published, and 1976, when his last collection The Unicorn and Other Tales was released.

== Life and work ==
He was born in Blayney, New South Wales, and grew up in West Wyalong where his father worked as bank manager. His observances of life in depression era country Australia were to become important to his later writing, and in particular to the folk tales for which he became famous in the 1940s and 1950s.

Stivens served in the army during the second world war, on the staff of the Australian Department of Information. He moved to England after the war and was press officer at Australia House in London until 1950. Upon his return to Australia he became a tireless worker for the rights of authors based on the work he had observed from the Society of Authors in England. He was Foundation President of the Australian Society of Authors, in 1963 and was involved in the creation of the Public Lending Right in 1975.

He was also a keen semi-amateur naturalist, producing an important work in that discipline, The Incredible Egg from 1974, and having published numerous articles in major American natural journals. He gave up writing in the mid 1970s in favour of art, and from 1974 he painted a substantial amount of his time, earning a small retrospective in the magazine, Australian Art in the late 70s.

Stivens was widely read through the forties and fifties, with his stories being heavily anthologized and included in many school readers of the time. He won the Miles Franklin Award for best Australian novel in 1970 for A Horse of Air and was winner of the Patrick White Award for 1981 for his contribution to Australian literature. In 1994, he was honoured with a Special Achievement Award in the NSW Premier's Literary Awards.

Stivens also wrote under a number of stories and many newspaper articles under the pseudonyms Jack Tarrant, John Sidney, Sam Johnson and L'Arva Street.

== Death and legacy ==
Stivens died in Sydney on 15 June 1997 after many years of domesticity in Lindfield, NSW, with Juanita Cragen, to whom he left his literary estate. On her death in 2007, Juanita left the estate to the Australian Society of Authors as the Dal Stivens Bequest. His papers are now held by the National Library of Australia in Canberra, and Fisher Library at the University of Sydney.

The Dal Stivens Award was inaugurated in 2007 and is presented every two years to a writer 30 or younger for an essay or literary short story.

== Bibliography ==
=== Novels ===
- Jimmy Brockett (aka The Entrepreneur) (1951)
- The Wide Arch (1958)
- Three Persons Make a Tiger (1968)
- A Horse of Air (1970)
- Well Anyway (written 1930s, published 2012)

=== Children's ===
- The Bushranger (1978)

=== Short story collections ===
- The Tramp and Other Stories (1936)
- The Courtship of Uncle Henry (1946)
- The Gambling Ghost and Other Tales (1953)
- Ironbark Bill (1955)
- The Scholarly Mouse and Other Tales (1957)
- Selected Stories 1936–1968 (1969)
- The Unicorn and Other Tales (1976)
- The Demon Bowler and Other Cricket Stories (1979)

=== Non-fiction ===
- The Incredible Egg (natural history, 1974)

=== Edited ===
- Coast to Coast: Australian stories 1957–1958 (1958)
