= Ŭ =

Latin letter U with breve

U with breve
- Ŭ ŭ
- U Ü W

Usage
- Writing system: Latin
- Type: alphabetic
- Language of origin: English language, Belarusian language, Esperanto language, Jarai language
- Sound values: [u̯]; [v]; [aʊ]; [eʊ]; [oʊ]; [ua]; [uo]; [meu]; [i]; [w]; [j]; [ʊ]; [ʌ]; [ə̆]

History
Development
G43T3
        - Υ υ
          - V v
            - U u
              - Ŭ ŭ
- Transliterations: Ў; Й; ◌ു്; ്; ॖ; Ъ; 으
- Variations: U Ü W

Ŭ or ŭ is a letter in the Belarusian Latin alphabet used since 1840/1845, based on u. It is also used in the Esperanto alphabet, publicly presented in 1887, and formerly in the Romanian alphabet. The accent mark (diacritic) is known as a breve.

This letter should not be confused with u-caron, which is used to indicate u in the third tone of Chinese language pinyin; compare Ǔ ǔ (caron) with Ŭ ŭ (breve).

It resembles an italic form of a Cyrillic Short I (Й й).

== Belarusian ==
The letter ŭ is called non-syllabic u (romanized: u nieskładovaje) in Belarusian because it resembles the vowel u but forms no syllables. It is an allophone of /v/ that forms the diphthongs aŭ, eŭ, oŭ and is equivalent to [u̯]. Its Cyrillic counterpart is ў. Sometimes (as in National Geographic atlases), the Cyrillic letter ў is Romanized as w.

The letter ŭ was proposed by Alexander Rypinski in 1840. For lack of the corresponding type, his book Białoruś. Kilka słów o poezji prostego ludu tej naszej polskiej prowincji, o jego muzyce, śpiewie, tańcach was printed with û in Belarusian citations instead, but it was explained that the proper letter was u with Latin brevis. The proper letter ŭ was first used in printing in 1845, in the novel Tajemnicze domino czyli Skutki niestałości by Gabriel Ossowski (in Polish with occasional Belarusian).

== Esperanto ==
Ŭ represents a semivowel in the orthography of Esperanto, which is an international auxiliary language publicly presented in 1887. As in Belarusian, Esperanto Ŭ is pronounced as a non-syllabic [u̯], primarily in the diphthongs aŭ, eŭ and (rarely) oŭ.

It is thought that ŭ was created by analogy with the Belarusian letter ў, which was proposed by P.A. Bessonov in 1870. It may also be considered that the placement of the breve above a vowel letter to turn it into an equivalent semivowel was inspired by the use thereof on the Cyrillic letter й, representing /j/, which is formed by placing a breve over the letter и (typically used for /i/ or /ɪ/).

Ŭ may also be used for [w] in foreign names, such as Ŭaŝingtono ('Washington'), although it usually is written with v, as in Vaŝingtono. It is also used for [w] in onomatopoeias, as in ŭa! ('waa!'), and in the letter's own Esperanto name, ŭo.

== Romanian ==
Ŭ was previously part of the Romanian alphabet. U with breve was used only in the ending of a word. It was essentially a Latin equivalent of the Slavonic back yer found in languages like Russian. Unpronounced in most cases, it served to indicate that the previous consonant was not palatalized, or that the preceding i was the vowel [i] and not a mere marker of palatalization. When ŭ was pronounced, it would follow a stressed vowel and stand in for semivowel u, as in words eŭ, aŭ, and meŭ, all spelled today without the breve. Once frequent, it survives today in author Mateiu Caragiale's name – originally spelled Mateiŭ (it is not specified whether the pronunciation should adopt a version that he himself probably never used, while in many editions he is still credited as Matei). In other names, only the breve was dropped, while preserving the pronunciation of a semivowel u, as is the case of B.P. Hasdeŭ. However, ŭ served additional orthographic functions. It was used to distinguish homographs such as the verb a voi ("to will") in the first person singular, written voiŭ (though pronounced voi), from the pronoun voi ("you," plural), which retained its simple form. Similarly, it helped differentiate singular and plural forms of certain nouns; for example, ochiŭ ("eye") versus ochi ("eyes"). In both cases, the pronunciation remained ochi, but the presence of ŭ in the singular form clarified grammatical number in writing.

== Munsee Delaware ==
Ŭ is used in the practical orthography of Munsee Delaware to represent an extra short version of the letter "u" that appears before the consonants M, N, L, W or Y in an unstressed syllable. Depending on the word, it may be pronounced as /ə̆/ or be completely dropped altogether. Alongside native Delaware words, ŭ can also often be found in English loanwords used in Delaware to break up consonant clusters that would otherwise go against its phonotactics, for example, like in the words "kŭlák", "kŭlúshmish" or "pŭlánzhŭmaan" ("clock", "Christmas" and "Frenchman" respectively).

== Romanization of Indic scripts ==
When transcribing Malayalam texts into ISO 15919, usually the final glottal-stop is transcribed as 'ŭ', an epenthetic vowel (a rule called as saṁvr̥tōkāram). In Tamil, any wordfinal-'u' is always a short-vowel, hence transcribing it as 'ŭ' (a rule called as kuṟṟiyal ukaram). The Kashmiri vowel –ٕ/ॖ is also sometimes transcribed as 'ŭ'.

== Other uses ==
In some philological transcriptions of Latin, "ŭ" denotes a short U — for example, "fŭgō" ([ˈfʊɡoː], to chase away), vs "fūmō" ([ˈfuːmoː], to smoke).

The letter is also commonly used among Slavists to denote the short back closed vowel of Proto-Slavic.

The McCune–Reischauer Romanization of Korean uses "ŭ" to signify the close back unrounded vowel in 으.

Several schemes for pronunciation of English words have used "ŭ". For example, The American Heritage Dictionary of the English Language has used "ŭ" for /ʌ/, the vowel in the English word "cut".

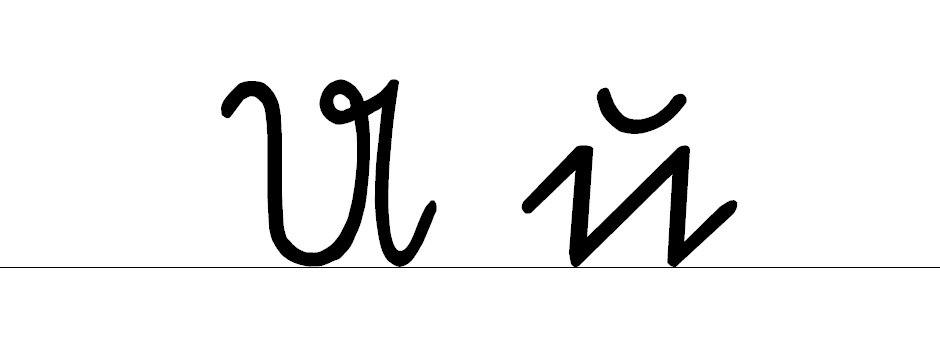
Sütterlin "u"

In Kurrentschrift, an outdated script used in German handwriting, the lower-case letter "u" is adorned with a breve to distinguish it from the otherwise identical letter "n". The script was used for teaching writing in schools; the last variant, known as Sütterlinschrift, as late as 1941. The ingrained habit of writing "ŭ" for "u" persisted for a long time even as people switched to cursive scripts with easily distinguishable shapes for "u" and "n", occasionally leading to confusion between "ŭ" (meaning "u") and "ü" among later generations not brought up with this tick.

== Computing codes ==
Character information
Preview	Ŭ		ŭ	
Unicode name	LATIN CAPITAL LETTER U WITH BREVE		LATIN SMALL LETTER U WITH BREVE	
Encodings	decimal	hex	dec	hex
Unicode	364	U+016C	365	U+016D
UTF-8	197 172	C5 AC	197 173	C5 AD
Numeric character reference	&#364;	&#x16C;	&#365;	&#x16D;
Named character reference	&Ubreve;		&ubreve;	
ISO 8859-3	221	DD	253	FD

== See also ==
- Esperanto orthography
- Short U (Ў) used in Belarusian and Uzbek Cyrillic alphabet
- Breve
- Short I (Й)
- Ĉ
- Ĝ
- Ĥ
- Ĵ
- Ŝ
