= Ü =

Latin letter U with umlaut/diaeresis

U with umlaut/diaeresis
- Ü ü
- V, UE, II

Usage
- Writing system: Latin script
- Type: alphabetic
- Sound values: [y]; [ʏ]; [u]; [w]; [ɔ]; [ɥ]; [yː]; [ɨ]

History
- Development: UE: Uͤ uͤ; Ü ü
- Variations: V, UE, II

Ü (minuscule: ü) is a Latin script character composed of the character U and the two dots diacritical mark. The meaning carried by the two dots varies depending on alphabet and context. In some alphabets, such as those of a number of Romance languages, it denotes the letter U with a diaeresis mark, used on a U that follows another vowel to indicate the two are part of separate syllables instead of being a digraph. In alphabets such as the Azerbaijani, Estonian, Hungarian and Turkish ones, Ü is a letter in its own right. In those cases it typically represents a close front rounded vowel [y]. In the German alphabet it is the umlauted form of the letter U.

Although not a part of their alphabet, Ü also appears in languages such as Finnish and Swedish when retained in foreign proper names like München ("Munich"). A small number of Dutch and Afrikaans words employ the character to mark vowel hiatus (e.g. reünie (/reːyˈni/) 'reunion'), a loanword marked with diaeresis to suppress the native reading of eu as a digraph pronounced /øː/).

== U-umlaut ==
A glyph, U with umlaut, appears in the German alphabet. It represents the umlauted form of U, which results in [yː] when long and [ʏ] when short. The letter is collated together with U, or as UE. In languages that have adopted German names or spellings, such as Swedish, the letter also occurs. It is however not a part of these languages' alphabets. In Swedish the letter is called tyskt y, meaning 'German y'.

Though not a part of the Slovene alphabet, ü is often used in eastern Styrian dialects, especially around Ptuj as well as in the Resian dialect with the same pronouncation as in German.

In other languages that do not have the letter as part of the regular alphabet or in limited character sets such as ASCII, U-umlaut is frequently replaced with the two-letter combination "ue". Software for optical character recognition sometimes sees it falsely as ii.

== Letter Ü ==
The letter "Ü" is present in the Hungarian, Turkish, Uyghur Latin, Estonian, Azeri, Turkmen, Crimean Tatar, Kazakh Latin and Tatar Latin alphabets, where it represents a close front rounded vowel [y]. It is considered a distinct letter, collated separately, not a simple modification of U or Y, and is distinct from UE.

Wayuu represents the close central unrounded vowel [ɨ] using this letter.

In the Swedish, Danish, Norwegian and Finnish alphabets ü is alphabetized as y.

It is not present in the Basque alphabet but the Souletin dialect uses it for [y].

This same letter appears in the Chinese Romanisations Pinyin, Wade–Giles, and the German-based Lessing-Othmer, where it represents the same sound [y]: 綠/lǜ (green) or 女/nǚ (female). Standard Mandarin Chinese pronunciation has both the sounds [y] and [u]. Pinyin only uses "Ü" to represent [y] after the letters "L" or "N" to avoid confusion with words such as 路/lù (road) and 怒/nù (anger). Words such as 玉/yù (jade) or 句/jù (sentence) are pronounced with [y], but are not spelled with "Ü", although Wade–Giles and Lessing use "Ü" in all situations. As the letter "Ü" is missing on most keyboards and the letter "V" is not present in standard Mandarin pinyin, the letter "V" is used on most computer Chinese input methods to enter the letter "Ü". As a result, romanisation of Chinese with the letter "V" representing the Ü sound is sometimes found. However, Ü sound should be officially represented by "yu" in Pinyin when it is difficult to enter Ü. For example, the surname Lü (吕) would be written as "Lyu" in passports, formerly it was represented simply as "Lu". Four extra tones for the letter "ü", which are "ǖ, ǘ, ǚ, ǜ", is added in Unicode as per GB/T 2312.

== U-diaeresis ==
Several languages use diaeresis over the letter U to show that the letter is pronounced in its regular way, without dropping out or building diphthongs with neighbouring letters.

In Catalan, ü is used in the letter combinations güe, güi, qüe and qüi to indicate the pronunciation [ɡwe], [ɡwi], [kwe] or [kwi], respectively (e.g. nicaragüenc, pingüins, qüestió, aqüicultura); this contrasts with the combinations gue/gui/que/qui, in which the u is silent ([ɡe], [ɡi], [ke], [ki]). Catalan also uses the letter ü to indicate that a vowel pair that would normally form a diphthong must be pronounced as separate syllables (e.g. baül, diürna).

Similarly, in Spanish, ü is used in the combinations güe [ɡwe] and güi [ɡwi], to distinguish them from gue [ɡe] and gui [ɡi] (e.g. nicaragüense, pingüinos). Unlike Catalan, though, Spanish does not use it after q, instead using cue and cui to spell words with [kwe] or [kwi] sounds (cuestión, acuicultura); it also does not use it to break diphthongs, sometimes using the letter ú for that purpose when necessary (baúl, but diurna).

In French, the diaeresis appears over u only very rarely, in some uncommon words, capharnaüm [-aɔm] ('shambles'), Capharnaüm/Capernaüm [-aɔm] or Emmaüs [-ays]. After the 1990 spelling reforms, it is applied to a few more words, like aigüe (formerly aiguë), ambigüe (formerly ambiguë) and argüer [aʁɡɥe] (formerly without the diaeresis).

== Usage in phonetic alphabets ==
In the Rheinische Dokumenta, a phonetic alphabet for many West Central German, Low Rhenish, and related vernacular languages, "ü" represents a range from [y] to [ʏ].

== Typography ==
Johann Martin Schleyer proposed alternate forms for Ü and ü (Ꞟ and ꞟ, respectively) in Volapük but they were rarely used.

Historically the unique letter Ü and U-diaeresis were written as a U with two dots above the letter.

U-umlaut was written as a U with a small e written above (Uͤ uͤ): this minute e degenerated to two vertical bars in medieval handwritings. In most later handwritings these bars in turn nearly became dots.

In modern typography there was insufficient space on typewriters and later computer keyboards to allow for both a U-with-dots (also representing Ü) and a U-with-bars. Since they looked near-identical the two glyphs were combined, which was also done in computer character encodings such as ISO 8859-1. As a result, there was no way to differentiate between the three different characters. While the distinction can be recreated in modern Unicode using combining diacritics, modern typographic standards do not recommend doing so. In the Hungarian alphabet, double acute U (Ű) is a distinct letter representing a long Ü.

== Computing codes ==
Character information
Preview	Ü		ü	
Unicode name	LATIN CAPITAL LETTER U WITH DIAERESIS		LATIN SMALL LETTER U WITH DIAERESIS	
Encodings	decimal	hex	dec	hex
Unicode	220	U+00DC	252	U+00FC
UTF-8	195 156	C3 9C	195 188	C3 BC
GB 18030	129 48 137 53	81 30 89 35	168 185	A8 B9
Numeric character reference	&#220;	&#xDC;	&#252;	&#xFC;
Named character reference	&Uuml;		&uuml;	
EBCDIC family	252	FC	220	DC
ISO 8859-1/2/3/4/9/10/14/15/16	220	DC	252	FC
CP437	154	9A	129	81
Code page 10029	134	86	159	9F
GB/T 2312, GBK, GB 18030			168 185	A8 B9
HKSCS			136 162	88 A2

=== Tonal marks for Hanyu Pinyin ===
Character information
Preview	Ǖ		ǖ		Ǘ		ǘ		Ǚ		ǚ		Ǜ		ǜ	
Unicode name	LATIN CAPITAL LETTER U WITH DIAERESIS AND MACRON		LATIN SMALL LETTER U WITH DIAERESIS AND MACRON		LATIN CAPITAL LETTER U WITH DIAERESIS AND ACUTE		LATIN SMALL LETTER U WITH DIAERESIS AND ACUTE		LATIN CAPITAL LETTER U WITH DIAERESIS AND CARON		LATIN SMALL LETTER U WITH DIAERESIS AND CARON		LATIN CAPITAL LETTER U WITH DIAERESIS AND GRAVE		LATIN SMALL LETTER U WITH DIAERESIS AND GRAVE	
Encodings	decimal	hex	dec	hex	dec	hex	dec	hex	dec	hex	dec	hex	dec	hex	dec	hex
Unicode	469	U+01D5	470	U+01D6	471	U+01D7	472	U+01D8	473	U+01D9	474	U+01DA	475	U+01DB	476	U+01DC
UTF-8	199 149	C7 95	199 150	C7 96	199 151	C7 97	199 152	C7 98	199 153	C7 99	199 154	C7 9A	199 155	C7 9B	199 156	C7 9C
GB 18030	129 48 159 57	81 30 9F 39	168 181	A8 B5	129 48 160 48	81 30 A0 30	168 182	A8 B6	129 48 160 49	81 30 A0 31	168 183	A8 B7	129 48 160 50	81 30 A0 32	168 184	A8 B8
Numeric character reference	&#469;	&#x1D5;	&#470;	&#x1D6;	&#471;	&#x1D7;	&#472;	&#x1D8;	&#473;	&#x1D9;	&#474;	&#x1DA;	&#475;	&#x1DB;	&#476;	&#x1DC;
GB/T 2312, GBK, GB 18030			168 181	A8 B5			168 182	A8 B6			168 183	A8 B7			168 184	A8 B8
HKSCS			136 124	88 7C			136 125	88 7D			136 126	88 7E			136 161	88 A1

=== Uralic Phonetic Alphabet symbols related to Ü ===
Character information
Preview	ᴞ	
Unicode name	LATIN SMALL LETTER SIDEWAYS DIAERESIZED U	
Encodings	decimal	hex
Unicode	7454	U+1D1E
UTF-8	225 180 158	E1 B4 9E
GB 18030	129 53 215 56	81 35 D7 38
Numeric character reference	&#7454;	&#x1D1E;

=== Keyboarding ===
The methods available for entering ⟨Ü⟩ and ⟨ü⟩ from the keyboard depend on the operating system, the keyboard layout, and the application.

- Microsoft Windows – some keyboard layouts feature separate keys for ⟨Ü⟩
  - Using the Swiss French keyboard, ⟨ü⟩ can be entered by typing ⇧ Shift+È
  - Using the US International layout, ⟨ü⟩ can be entered by typing AltGR+Y
- Microsoft Windows: with the Number Lock on, hold down the Alt key while typing on the numeric keypad the decimal value of the code point from the active DOS/OEM code page without a leading zero, then release the Alt key; i.e. Alt+1+5+4 for ⟨Ü⟩ and Alt+1+2+9 for ⟨ü⟩
- Microsoft Windows: with the Number Lock on, hold down the Alt key while typing on the numeric keypad the decimal value of the code point from the active ANSI code page with a leading zero, then release the Alt key; i.e. Alt+0+2+2+0 for ⟨Ü⟩ and Alt+0+2+5+2 for ⟨ü⟩
- Microsoft Word for Windows: type Ctrl+: followed by ⇧ Shift+U for ⟨Ü⟩ or Ctrl+: then U for ⟨ü⟩
- macOS with an English keyboard layout (Australian, British, or U.S.): type ⌥ Option+U followed by ⇧ Shift+U for ⟨Ü⟩ or ⌥ Option+U and then U for ⟨ü⟩ or by keeping the U key pressed and then typing 2
- In Linux-based operating systems, this symbol may be typed by pressing the Compose key followed by u, ".
- In GTK-based GUI-Applications, Ctrl+⇧ Shift+U followed by the Hex-Code

== See also ==
- Umlaut (diacritic)
- Ӱ ӱ : Cyrillic letter U with diaeresis
- Ү ү : Cyrillic letter Ue
