= Ꞟ =

Additional letter of Latin alphabet

- Ꞟ ꞟ

Usage
- Writing system: Latin script
- Type: Alphabet
- Language of origin: Volapük

Ꞟ (minuscule: ꞟ) was an additional letter of the Latin alphabet that was used in the writing of Volapük in the 19th century. It is now transcribed ⟨Ü ü⟩ in Volapük.

Volapük Ä, ö, and ü in a Volapük grammar sheet by Schleyer in 1884.

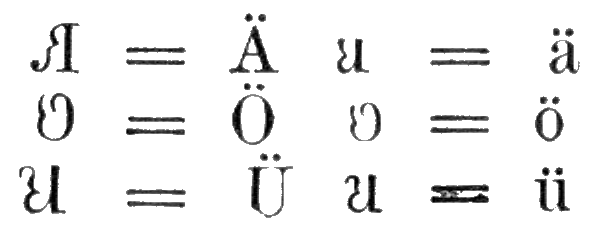
Volapük ä, ö, and ü used by Julius Lott in 1888.

This letter was proposed by Johann Martin Schleyer, alongside the letters Ä ä ⟨Ꞛ ꞛ⟩ and Ö ö ⟨Ꞝ ꞝ⟩ in the orthography of Volapük and was used briefly.

This letter, as well as the letters Ꞛ and Ꞝ were replaced in Volapük writing by the Latin letters with umlaut ⟨Ä ä, Ö ö, Ü ü⟩ at the Munich Congress of 1887.

== Computing codes ==
The Volapük ü can be represented with the following Unicode (Latin Extended-D) characters:

Character information
Preview	Ꞟ		ꞟ	
Unicode name	LATIN CAPITAL LETTER VOLAPUK UE		LATIN SMALL LETTER VOLAPUK UE	
Encodings	decimal	hex	dec	hex
Unicode	42910	U+A79E	42911	U+A79F
UTF-8	234 158 158	EA 9E 9E	234 158 159	EA 9E 9F
Numeric character reference	&#42910;	&#xA79E;	&#42911;	&#xA79F;
