= Circumflex =

Diacritical mark (◌̂)

◌̂o

Circumflex (diacritic)
- U+0302 ◌̂ COMBINING CIRCUMFLEX ACCENT

^o

Circumflex (symbol)
- In Unicode: U+005E ^ CIRCUMFLEX ACCENT (freestanding symbol, see below) U+02C6 ˆ MODIFIER LETTER CIRCUMFLEX ACCENT (IPA, UPA etc. symbol) U+FF3E ＾ FULLWIDTH CIRCUMFLEX ACCENT (freestanding)

Different from
- Different from: U+0302 ◌̂ COMBINING CIRCUMFLEX ACCENT (diacritic) U+2038 ‸ CARET U+2227 ∧ LOGICAL AND

Related
- See also: Similar free-standing accent symbols: U+0060 ` GRAVE ACCENT; U+007E ~ TILDE; U+00B4 ´ ACUTE ACCENT

The circumflex (◌̂) is a diacritic in the Latin and Greek scripts that is also used in the written forms of many languages and in various romanization and transcription schemes. It received its English name from Latin: circumflexus "bent around"—a translation of the Ancient Greek: περισπωμένη (perispōménē).

The circumflex in the Latin script is chevron-shaped (◌̂), while the Greek circumflex may be displayed either like a tilde (◌̃) or like an inverted breve (◌̑). For the most commonly encountered uses of the accent in the Latin alphabet, precomposed characters are available.

In English, the circumflex, like other diacritics, is sometimes retained on loanwords that used it in the original language (for example entrepôt, crème brûlée). In mathematics and statistics, the circumflex diacritic is sometimes used to denote a function and is called a hat operator.

A free-standing version of the circumflex symbol, ^, is encoded in ASCII and Unicode and has become known as caret and has acquired special uses, particularly in computing and mathematics. The original caret, ‸, is used in proofreading to indicate insertion.

== Uses ==
=== Diacritic on vowels ===
==== Pitch ====
The circumflex has its origins in the polytonic orthography of Ancient Greek, where it marked long vowels that were pronounced with high and then falling pitch. In a similar vein, the circumflex is today used to mark tone contour in the International Phonetic Alphabet. This is also how it is used in Bamanankan (as opposed to a háček, which signifies a rising tone on a syllable).

The shape of the circumflex was originally a combination of the acute and grave accents (◌́ + ◌̀, yielding ◌̂), as it marked a syllable contracted from two vowels: an acute-accented vowel and a non-accented vowel (all non-accented syllables in Ancient Greek were once marked with a grave accent). Later a variant similar to the tilde (◌̃) was also used.

νόος	contraction → (synaeresis)	ν-´ō`-ς = νō͂ς = νοῦς
nóos	contraction → (synaeresis)	n-´ō`-s = nō̂s = noûs

The term "circumflex" is also used to describe similar tonal accents that result from combining two vowels in related languages such as Sanskrit and Latin.

Since Modern Greek has a stress accent instead of a pitch accent, the circumflex has been replaced with an acute accent in the modern monotonic orthography.

==== Length ====
The circumflex accent marks a long vowel in the orthography or transliteration of several languages.

- In Afrikaans, the circumflex marks a vowel with a lengthened pronunciation, often arising from compensatory lengthening due to the loss of ⟨g⟩ from the original Dutch form. Examples of circumflex use in Afrikaans are sê "to say", wêreld "world", môre "tomorrow", brûe "bridges".
- In the transliteration of Akkadian, the circumflex indicates a long vowel resulting from an aleph contraction.
- In western Cree, Sauk, and Saulteaux, the Algonquianist Standard Roman Orthography (SRO) indicates long vowels [aː eː iː oː~uː] either with a circumflex ⟨â ê î ô⟩ or with a macron ⟨ā ē ī ō⟩.
- The PDA orthography for Domari uses circumflex-bearing vowels for length.
- In Emilian, ⟨â î û⟩, are used to represent [aː, iː, uː]
- French: In some varieties – such as in Northern French, Belgian French, Swiss French and Quebec French – vowels with a circumflex are usually long: fête [feːt] (party) is longer than faite [fɛt]. This length compensates for a deleted consonant, usually ⟨s⟩. French words with deleted ⟨s⟩ include châtain and hôpital.
- Standard Friulian.
- Japanese: In the Nihon-shiki system of romanization, the circumflex is used to indicate long vowels which were inherited from the Portuguese alphabet (⟨â, ê, î, ô, û⟩ in particular). The Kunrei-shiki system – which is based on Nihon-shiki system – also uses the circumflex. The Traditional and Modified forms of the Hepburn system use the macron for this purpose, though some users may use the circumflex as a substitute if there are difficulties inputting the macron, as the two diacritics are visually fairly similar.
- Jèrriais.
- In UNGEGN romanization system for Khmer: ⟨â⟩ is used to represent [ɑː], ⟨ê⟩ [ae] in first series and [ɛː] in second series, and ⟨ô⟩ for [ɔː]. There are also additional vowels which are diphthongs such as ⟨aô⟩ [ao], ⟨âu⟩ [ʔɨw], ⟨âm⟩ [ɑm], ⟨ŏâm⟩ [oəm] and ⟨aôh⟩ [ɑh].
- In Kurmanji Kurdish, ⟨ê, î, û⟩ are used to represent /eː iː uː/.
- In Mikasuki, circumflexed vowels indicate a rising and falling pitch or tone.
- In Adûnaic, Black Speech and Khuzdul – constructed languages of J. R. R. Tolkien – all long vowels are transcribed with the circumflex. In Sindarin – another of Tolkien's languages – long vowels in polysyllabic words take the acute but a circumflex in monosyllables used to mark a non-phonemic extra lengthening.

==== Stress ====
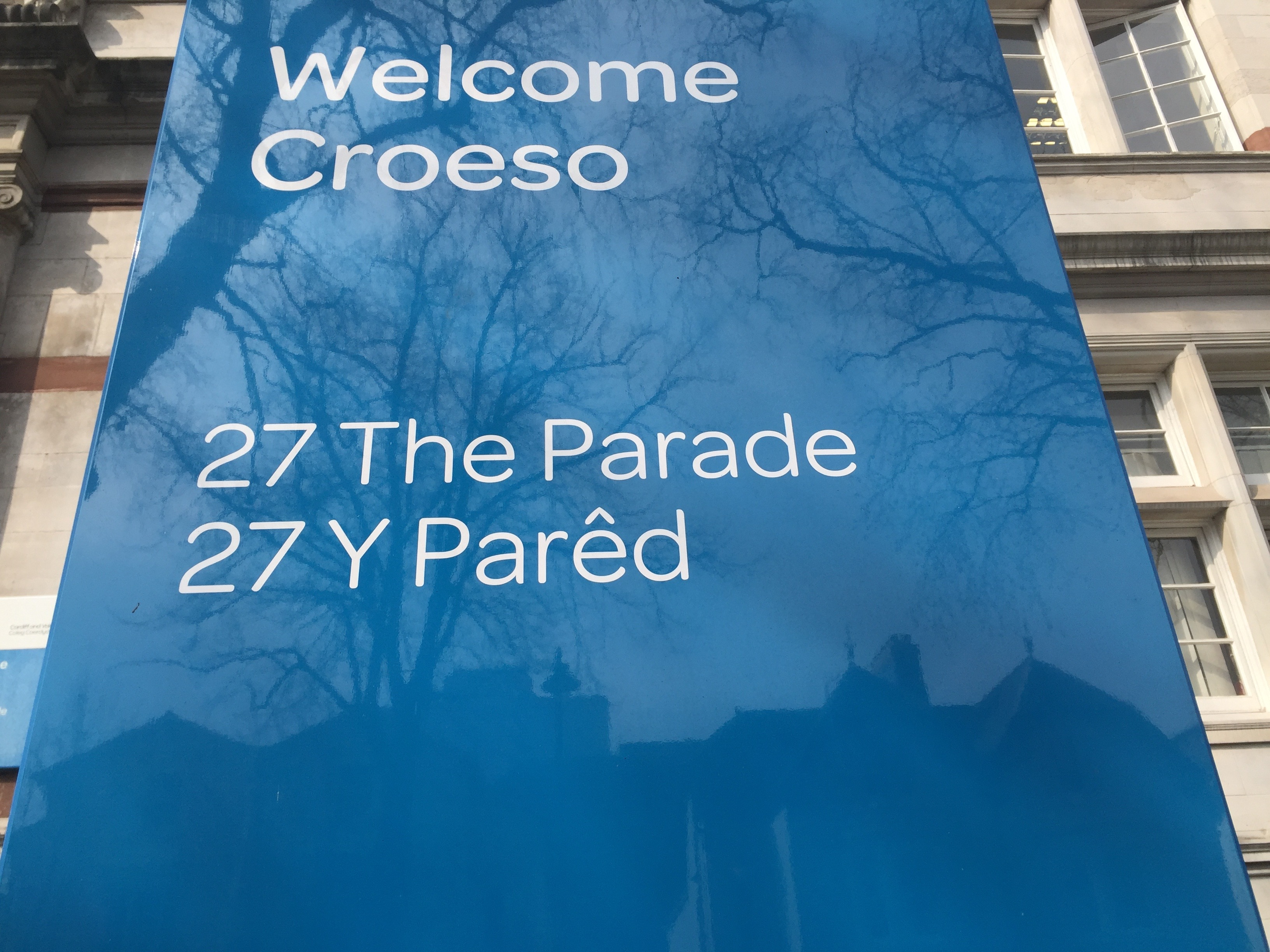
Bilingual sign showing the use of the circumflex in Welsh as an indicator of length and stress: parêd [paˈreːd] 'parade', as opposed to pared [ˈparɛd] 'partition wall"'.

The circumflex accent marks the stressed vowel of a word in some languages:

- Portuguese ⟨â⟩, ⟨ê⟩ and ⟨ô⟩ are stressed close vowels, opposed to their open counterparts ⟨á⟩, ⟨é⟩ and ⟨ó⟩ (see below).
- Welsh: the circumflex – due to its function as a disambiguating lengthening sign (see above) – is used in polysyllabic words with word-final long vowels. The circumflex thus indicates the stressed syllable (which would normally be on the penultimate syllable), since in Welsh, non-stressed vowels may not normally be long. This happens notably where the singular ends in an ⟨a⟩, to, e.g. singular camera, drama, opera, sinema → plural camerâu, dramâu, operâu, sinemâu; however, it also occurs in singular nominal forms, e.g. arwyddocâd; in verbal forms, e.g. deffrônt, cryffânt; etc.

==== Vowel quality ====
- In Breton, it is used on an ⟨e⟩ to show that the letter is pronounced open instead of closed.
- In Bulgarian, the sound represented in Bulgarian by the Cyrillic letter ъ (er goljam) is usually transliterated as â in systems used prior to 1989. Although called a schwa (misleadingly suggesting an unstressed lax sound), it is more accurately described as a mid back unrounded vowel /ɤ/. Unlike English or French, but similar to Romanian and Afrikaans, it can be stressed.
- In Pinyin romanized Mandarin Chinese, ⟨ê⟩ is used to represent the sound /ɛ/ in isolation, which occurs sometimes as an exclamation.
- In French, the letter ⟨â⟩ is usually pronounced /ɑ/ in some varieties of French: Swiss French and Quebec French. In the usual pronunciations of central and northern France, ô is pronounced /o/, like eau, eû is pronounced /ø/, like eux; in Southern France, no distinction is made between /ɔ/ and /o/, /œ/ and /ø/.
- In Phuthi, ⟨î'⟩ and ⟨û⟩ are used to mark superclose vowels /ɪ/ and /ʊ/, respectively.
- Portuguese ⟨â⟩ /ɐ/, ⟨ê⟩ /e/, and ⟨ô⟩ /o/ are stressed high vowels, in opposition to ⟨á⟩ /a/, ⟨é⟩ /ɛ/, and ⟨ó⟩ /ɔ/, which are stressed low vowels.
- In Romanian, the circumflex is used on the vowels ⟨â⟩ and ⟨î⟩ to mark the vowel /ɨ/, similar to Russian yery. The names of these accented letters are â din a and î din i, respectively. (The letter ⟨â⟩ only appears in the middle of words; thus, its majuscule version appears only in all-capitals inscriptions.)
- In Slovak, the circumflex (vokáň) on an ⟨ô⟩ (uppercase ⟨Ô⟩) indicates a diphthong [ʊɔ].
- In Swedish dialect and folklore literature the circumflex is used to indicate the phonemes /a(ː)/ or /æ(ː)/ (⟨â⟩), /ɶ(ː)/ or /ɞ(ː)/ (ô) and /ɵ(ː)/ (û) in dialects and regional accents where these are distinct from /ɑ(ː)/ (⟨a⟩), /ø(ː)/ (⟨'ö⟩) or /o(ː)/ (⟨o⟩ or ⟨å⟩) and /ʉ(ː)/ (⟨u⟩) respectively, unlike Standard Swedish where [a] and [ɑː], [ɵ] and [ʉː] are short and long allophones of the phonemes /a/ and /ʉ/ respectively, and where Old Swedish short /o/ (ŏ) has merged with /o(ː)/ from Old Swedish /ɑː/ (ā, Modern Swedish ⟨å⟩) instead of centralizing to [ɞ] or fronting to [ɶ] and remaining a distinct phoneme (⟨ô⟩) as in the dialects in question. Different methods can be found in different literature, so some author may use ⟨æ⟩ instead of ⟨â⟩, or use ⟨â⟩ where others use ⟨å̂⟩ (⟨å⟩ with a circumflex; for a sound between /ɑ(ː)/ and /o(ː)/).
- Vietnamese ⟨â⟩ /ə/, ⟨ê⟩ /e/, and ⟨ô⟩ /o/ are higher vowels than ⟨a⟩ /ɑ/, ⟨e⟩ /ɛ/, and ⟨o⟩ /ɔ/. The circumflex can appear together with a tone mark on the same vowel, as in the word Việt. Vowels with circumflex are considered separate letters from the base vowels.

==== Nasality ====
- In Luxembourgish ⟨m̂⟩ ⟨n̂⟩ can be used to indicate nasalisation of a vowel. Also, the circumflex can be over the vowel to indicate nasalisation. In either case, the circumflex is rare.
- In several indigenous languages of New Caledonia, a circumflex indicates nasality on vowels: e.g. the orthography Xârâcùù contrasts its oral vowels ⟨a⟩ /ɑ/, ⟨e⟩ /ɛ/, ⟨i⟩ /i/, ⟨u⟩ /u/ with its nasal vowels ⟨â⟩ /ɑ̃/, ⟨ê⟩ /ɛ̃/, ⟨î⟩ /ĩ/, ⟨ô⟩ /ɔ̃/, ⟨û⟩ /ũ/ – with duplicated variants indicating length (e.g. ⟨êê⟩ /ɛ̃ː/). Due to typographical shortage of characters, some nasal vowels in Xârâcùù are encoded with a two dots diacritic: e.g. ⟨ä⟩ /ʌ̃/, ⟨ü⟩ /ɨ̃/).

==== Other articulatory features ====
- In Emilian, ⟨ê, ô⟩ [eː, oː] denote both length and height.
- In Tagalog, Cebuano and most Philippine languages, the circumflex accent (pakupyâ) is used to represent the simultaneous occurrence of a stress and a glottal stop on the last vowel of a word. Though not part of the official alphabet, possible combinations can include: ⟨â⟩, ⟨ê⟩, ⟨î⟩, ⟨ô⟩, and ⟨û⟩. But in the case of T'boli, the circumflex accent is only used as a pure unstressed glottal stop. It works as a combination of acute and grave accent; with the case of letters ⟨é⟩ and ⟨ó⟩ which represents the sound of /ɛ/ and /o/ respectively and can be shown as ⟨ê⟩ and ⟨ô⟩ if it contains a glottal stop.
- In Romagnol, they are used to represent the diphthongs /eə, oə/, whose specific articulation varies between dialects, e.g. sêl [seəl~seɛl~sæɛl~sɛɘl] "salt".
- In Old Tupi, the circumflex changed a vowel into a semivowel: ⟨î⟩ [j], ⟨û⟩ [w], and ⟨ŷ⟩ [ɰ].
- In Rusyn, the letter ⟨ŷ⟩ [ɨ] is sometimes used to transliterate the Cyrillic letter ⟨ы⟩.
- In Turkish, the circumflex over ⟨a⟩ and ⟨u⟩ is sometimes used in words of Arabic or Persian derivation to indicate when a preceding consonant (⟨k⟩, ⟨g⟩, ⟨l⟩) is to be pronounced as a palatal plosive; [c], [ɟ] (kâğıt, gâvur, mahkûm, Gülgûn). The circumflex over ⟨î⟩ is used to indicate a nisba suffix (millî, dinî).
- In Pe̍h-ōe-jī romanization of Hokkien, the circumflex over a vowel (⟨â⟩, ⟨ê⟩, ⟨î⟩, ⟨ô⟩, and ⟨û⟩) or a syllabic nasal (⟨m⟩, ⟨ng⟩) indicate the tone number 5, traditionally called Yang Level or Light Level (陽平). The tone contour is usually low rising. For example, ⟨ê⟩ [e˩˧], n̂g [ŋ̍˩˧].

==== Visual discrimination between homographs ====
- In Serbo-Croatian the circumflex can be used to distinguish homographs, and it is called the "genitive sign" or "length sign". Examples include sam "am" versus sâm "alone". For example, the phrase "I am alone" may be written Ja sam sâm to improve clarity. Another example: da "yes", dâ "gives".
- Turkish. According to Turkish Language Association orthography, düzeltme işareti "correction mark" over a, i and u marks a long vowel to disambiguate similar words. For example, compare ama "but" and âmâ "blind", şura 'that place, there' and şûra "council". In general, circumflexes occur only in Arabic and Persian loanwords as vowel length in early Turkish was not phonemic. However, this standard was never applied entirely consistently and by the late 20th century many publications had stopped using circumflexes almost entirely.
- Welsh. The circumflex is known as hirnod "long sign" or acen grom "crooked accent", but more usually and colloquially as to bach "little roof". It lengthens a stressed vowel (a, e, i, o, u, w, y), and is used particularly to differentiate between homographs; e.g. tan and tân, ffon and ffôn, gem and gêm, cyn and cŷn, or gwn and gŵn. However the circumflex is only required on elongated vowels if the same word exists without the circumflex - "nos" (night), for example, has an elongated "o" sound but a circumflex is not required as the same word with a shortened "o" doesn't exist.
- The orthography of French has a few pairs of homophones that are only distinguished by the circumflex: e.g. du [dy] (partitive article) vs. dû [dy] 'due'.

=== Diacritic on consonants ===
- In Pinyin, the romanized writing of Mandarin Chinese, ⟨ẑ⟩, ⟨ĉ⟩, and ⟨ŝ⟩ are, albeit rarely, used to represent ⟨zh⟩ [tʂ], ⟨ch⟩ [tʂʰ], and ⟨sh⟩ [ʂ], respectively.
- In Esperanto, the circumflex is used on ⟨ĉ⟩ [tʃ], ⟨ĝ⟩ [dʒ], ⟨ĥ⟩ [x], ⟨ĵ⟩ [ʒ], ⟨ŝ⟩ [ʃ]. Each indicates a different consonant from the unaccented form, and is considered a separate letter for purposes of collation. (See Esperanto orthography.)
- In Nsenga, ⟨ŵ⟩ denotes the labiodental approximant /ʋ/.
- In Chichewa, ⟨ŵ⟩ (present for example in the name of the country Malaŵi) used to denote the voiced bilabial fricative /β/; nowadays, however, most Chichewa-speakers pronounce it as a regular [w].
- In Nias, ⟨ŵ⟩ denotes the semivowel [w].
- In the African language Venda, a circumflex below ⟨d⟩, ⟨l⟩, ⟨n⟩, and ⟨t⟩ is used to represent dental consonants: ⟨ḓ⟩, ⟨ḽ⟩, ⟨ṋ⟩, ⟨ṱ⟩.
- In the 18th century, the Real Academia Española introduced the circumflex accent in Spanish to mark that a ⟨ch⟩ or ⟨x⟩ were pronounced /k/ and /ɡs/ respectively (instead of /tʃ/ and /x/, which were the default values): châracteres, exâcto (spelled today caracteres, exacto). This usage was quickly abandoned during the same century, once the RAE decided to use ⟨ch⟩ and ⟨x⟩ with one assigned pronunciation only: /tʃ/ and /ɡs/ respectively.
- In Domari (according to the Pan-Domari Alphabet orthography), the circumflex is used on the letters ⟨ĉ ĝ ĵ ŝ ẑ⟩ to represent the sounds of /t͡ʃ ɣ d͡ʒ ʃ ʒ/. It is also used above vowels to indicate length.

=== Abbreviation, contraction, and disambiguation ===
==== English ====
In 18th century British English, before the cheap Penny Post and while paper was taxed, the combination ough was occasionally shortened to ⟨ô⟩ when the gh was not pronounced, to save space: thô for though, thorô for thorough, and brôt for brought.

==== French ====
In French, the circumflex generally marks the former presence of a consonant (usually s) that was deleted and is no longer pronounced. (The corresponding Norman French words, and consequently the words derived from them in English, frequently retain the lost consonant.) For example:

- ancêtre "ancestor"
- hôpital "hospital"
- hôtel "hostel"
- forêt "forest"
- rôtir "to roast"
- côte "rib, coast, slope"
- pâté "paste"
- août "August"
- dépôt (from the Latin: depositum 'deposit', but now referring to both a deposit or a storehouse of any kind)

Some homophones (or near-homophones in some varieties of French) are distinguished by the circumflex. However, ⟨â⟩, ⟨ê⟩ and ⟨ô⟩ distinguish different sounds in most varieties of French, for instance cote [kɔt] "level, mark, code number" and côte [kot] "rib, coast, hillside".

In handwritten French, for example in taking notes, m̂ is an informal abbreviation for même "same".

In February 2016, the Académie Française decided to remove the circumflex from about 2,000 words, a plan that had been outlined since 1990. However, usage of the circumflex would not be considered incorrect.

==== Italian ====
In Italian, ⟨î⟩ is occasionally used in the plural of nouns and adjectives ending with -io [jo] as a crasis mark. Other possible spellings are -ii and obsolete -j or -ij. For example, the plural of vario [ˈvaːrjo] "various" can be spelt vari, varî, varii; the pronunciation will usually stay [ˈvaːri] with only one [i]. The plural forms of principe [ˈprintʃipe] "prince" and of principio [prinˈtʃiːpjo] "principle, beginning" can be confusing. In pronunciation, they are distinguished by whether the stress is on the first or on the second syllable, but principi would be a correct spelling of both. When necessary to avoid ambiguity, it is advised to write the plural of principio as principî or as principii.

==== Latin ====
In Neo-Latin, circumflex was used most often to disambiguate between forms of the same word that used a long vowel, for example ablative of first declension and genitive of fourth declension, or between second and third conjugation verbs. It was also used for the interjection ⟨ô⟩.

==== Norwegian ====
In Norwegian, the circumflex differentiates fôr "lining, fodder" from the preposition for. From a historical point of view, the circumflex also indicates that the word used to be spelled with the letter ⟨ð⟩ in Old Norse – for example, fôr is derived from fóðr, lêr 'leather' from leðr, and vêr "weather, ram" from veðr (both lêr and vêr only occur in the Nynorsk spelling; in Bokmål these words are spelled lær and vær). After the ⟨ð⟩ disappeared, it was replaced by a ⟨d⟩ (fodr, vedr).

==== Portuguese ====
Circumflexes are used in many common words of the language, such as the name of the language, português. Usually, ⟨â⟩, ⟨ê⟩ and ⟨ô⟩ appear before nasals (⟨m⟩ and ⟨n⟩) in proparoxytone words, like higiênico but in many cases in European Portuguese ⟨e⟩ and ⟨o⟩ will be marked with an acute accent (e.g. higiénico) since the vowel quality is open (ɛ or ɔ) in this standard variety. In early literacy classes in school, it is commonly nicknamed chapéu (hat).

==== Welsh ====
The circumflex (ˆ) is mostly used to mark long vowels, so ⟨â, ê, î, ô, û, ŵ, ŷ⟩ are always long. However, not all long vowels are marked with a circumflex, so the letters ⟨a, e, i, o, u, w, y⟩ with no circumflex do not necessarily represent short vowels.

=== Mathematics ===
In mathematics, the circumflex is used to modify variable names; it is usually read "hat", e.g., $\hat x$ is "x hat". The Fourier transform of a function ƒ is often denoted by $\hat f$.

In geometry, a hat is sometimes used for an angle. For instance, the angles $\hat{A}$ or $\widehat{ABC}$.

In vector notation, a hat above a letter indicates a unit vector (a dimensionless vector with a magnitude of 1). For instance, $\hat{\mathbf{\imath}}$, $\hat{\mathbf{x}}$, or $\hat{\mathbf{e}}_1$ stands for a unit vector in the direction of the x-axis of a Cartesian coordinate system.

In statistics, the hat is used to denote an estimator or an estimated value, as opposed to its theoretical counterpart. For example, in errors and residuals, the hat in $\hat\varepsilon$ indicates an observable estimate (the residual) of an unobservable quantity called $\varepsilon$ (the statistical error). It is read x-hat or x-roof, where x represents the character under the hat.

In Quantum Mechanics, the hat is sometimes used to mark a quantum observable; the observable $\hat A$ is the self-adjoint operator implying a measurement whose $n^{th}$ moment is $\langle\psi | \hat A^n|\psi\rangle$ when the prevailing quantum state is $\psi$.

=== Music ===
In music theory and musicology, a circumflex above a numeral is used to make reference to a particular scale degree.

In music notation, a chevron-shaped symbol placed above a note indicates marcato, a special form of emphasis or accent. In music for string instruments, a narrow inverted chevron indicates that a note should be performed up-bow.

== Circumflex below ==
A circumflex below a vowel – for example, ⟨ḙ⟩ – is a notation used by the Uralic Phonetic Alphabet to indicate a raised variant of the vowel.

The Venda language has four letters with circumflex below – ⟨ḓ⟩, ⟨ḽ⟩, ⟨ṋ⟩ and ⟨ṱ⟩ – to indicate a dental consonant.

== Unicode ==
Unicode encodes a number of cases of "letter with circumflex" as precomposed characters and these are displayed below. In addition, many more symbols may be composed using the combining character facility (U+0302 ◌̂ COMBINING CIRCUMFLEX ACCENT and U+032D ◌̭ COMBINING CIRCUMFLEX ACCENT BELOW) that may be used with any letter or other diacritic to create a customised symbol but this does not mean that the result has any real-world application and thus are not shown in the table.

- Circumflex ◌̂ Â â
- Ĉ ĉ
- Ê ê
- Ĝ ĝ
- Ĥ ĥ
- Î î
- Ĵ ĵ
- Ô ô
- Ố ố
- Ồ ồ
- Ổ ổ
- Ỗ ỗ
- Ộ ộ
- Ŝ ŝ
- Û û
- Ŵ ŵ
- X̂ x̂
- Ŷ ŷ
- Ẑ ẑ

The Greek diacritic περισπωμένη, perispōménē, 'twisted around', is encoded as U+0342 ◌͂ COMBINING GREEK PERISPOMENI. Unlike the angled Latin circumflex, the Greek circumflex is printed in the form of either a tilde (◌̃) or an inverted breve (◌̑). (Note: The representative glyph displayed here is not prescriptive and is chosen by the default font on the reader's browser or system.)

=== Freestanding circumflex ===
There is a similar but larger character, U+005E ^ CIRCUMFLEX ACCENT (&Hat;), which was originally intended to emulate the typewriter's dead key function using backspace and overtype. Nowadays, this grapheme is more often called a caret instead (though that term has a long-standing meaning as a proofreader's mark, with its own codepoints in Unicode). It is, however, unsuitable for use as a diacritic on modern computer systems, as it is a spacing character. Two other spacing circumflex characters in Unicode are the smaller modifier letters U+02C6 ˆ MODIFIER LETTER CIRCUMFLEX ACCENT and U+A788 ꞈ MODIFIER LETTER LOW CIRCUMFLEX ACCENT, mainly used in phonetic notations or as a sample of the diacritic in isolation.

=== Typing the circumflex accent ===
French AZERTY layout with 'combining circumflex' as a dead key (beside P)

In countries where the local language(s) routinely include letters with a circumflex, local keyboards are typically engraved with those symbols.

For users with other keyboards, see QWERTY#Multilingual variants and Unicode input.

== See also ==
- Caret (disambiguation)
- Caron – Diacritical mark (◌̌)
- Circumflex in French – Diacritic used in French orthography
- Macron (diacritic) – Diacritical mark (◌̄)
- Tilde – Punctuation and accent mark (~, ◌̃)
- Turned v – Letter of the Latin alphabet
- O with circumflex (Cyrillic) – Cyrillic letter
