= Ĉ =

Latin letter C with circumflex

C circumflex
- Ĉ ĉ

Usage
- Writing system: Latin script
- Type: Alphabetic
- Language of origin: Esperanto, Khinalug, Bandial, Yukpa, Nivaĉle
- Sound values: [t͡ʃ], [q]
- In Unicode: U+0108, U+0109
- Alphabetical position: 4

History
Development
  T14
          - ج
            - Γ γ
              - 𐌂
                - C c
                  - Ĉ ĉ
- Transliterations: č; ç; cz; ch; tch; tsch; cs; tx; ci; ce

Other
- Associated numbers: 4

Ĉ or ĉ (C circumflex) is a consonant in Esperanto orthography, representing the sound [t͡ʃ], the pronunciation of the English ⟨ch⟩ as in "cheese".

It is based on the letter ⟨c⟩. Esperanto orthography uses a diacritic for all four of its postalveolar consonants, as do the Latin-based Slavic alphabets. Letters and digraphs that are similar to ⟨ĉ⟩ and represent the same sound include Slovene and Croatian ⟨č⟩, Turkish and Albanian ⟨ç⟩, Polish digraph ⟨cz⟩, English and Spanish digraph ⟨ch⟩, French trigraph ⟨tch⟩, German tetragraph ⟨tsch⟩, Hungarian digraph ⟨cs⟩, Basque and Catalan digraph ⟨tx⟩ and Italian ⟨ci⟩.

⟨Ĉ⟩ is the fourth letter in Esperanto orthography. Although it is written as cx and ch respectively in the x-system and h-system workarounds, it is normally written as C with a circumflex: ⟨ĉ⟩.

== Character mappings ==
Character information
Preview	Ĉ		ĉ	
Unicode name	LATIN CAPITAL LETTER C WITH CIRCUMFLEX		LATIN SMALL LETTER C WITH CIRCUMFLEX	
Encodings	decimal	hex	dec	hex
Unicode	264	U+0108	265	U+0109
UTF-8	196 136	C4 88	196 137	C4 89
Numeric character reference	&#264;	&#x108;	&#265;	&#x109;
Named character reference	&Ccirc;		&ccirc;	

== See also ==
- Ĝ
- Ĥ
- Ĵ
- Ŝ
- Ŭ
