= Ŝ =

Latin letter S with circumflex

Latin S with circumflex

Ŝ or ŝ (S with circumflex) is a consonant in Esperanto orthography, representing the sound [ʃ].

Esperanto orthography uses a diacritic for all four of its postalveolar consonants, as do most Latin-based Slavic alphabets (Polish is the most notable exception). Letters and digraphs that are similar to ŝ (also based on s) and which represent the same sound include the Czech, Latvian, Lithuanian, Slovak, Slovene, Serbian Latin, and Croatian š; the Albanian and English sh; the German sch; the Polish sz; the Azerbaijani, Turkish, and Turkmen ş; the Romanian ș; the Hungarian s; the French ch; and the Portuguese x and ch. The Cyrillic letter ш represents the same sound and represents a circumflex type with the up in down fricative consonant.

Ŝ is used in ISO 9:1995 (standard of transliteration into Latin characters of Cyrillic characters) for letter Щ, and is used in the orthography of the Tsilhqotʼin language.

Ŝ is the twenty-third letter in Esperanto orthography. Although it is written as sx and sh respectively in the x-system and h-system workarounds, it is normally written as S with a circumflex: ŝ.

== See also ==
- Ĉ
- Ĝ
- Ĥ
- Ĵ
- Ŭ
