= Ĥ =

Latin letter H with circumflex

Latin H with circumflex

Ĥ or ĥ is a letter of some extended Latin alphabets, most prominently a consonant in Esperanto orthography, where it represents a voiceless velar fricative [x] or voiceless uvular fricative [χ]. Its name in Esperanto is ĥo (pronounced /xo/), or ĥi in the Kalocsay abecedary.

It is also used in the revised Demers/Blanchet/St Onge orthography for Chinook Jargon.

In the case of the minuscule, some fonts place the circumflex centered above the entire base letter h, others over the riser of the letter, and others over the shoulder.

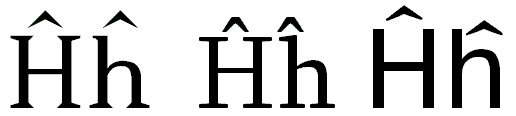
⟨ĥ⟩ in the fonts Code2000, Sylfaen, Pragmatica Esperanto

Ĥ is the eleventh letter in Esperanto orthography. Although it is written as hx and hh respectively in the x-system and h-system workarounds, it is normally written as H with a circumflex: ĥ.

== History ==
"Ĥ" was created by adding a circumflex to an ordinary "H". It first appeared as part of the alphabet of the international language Esperanto, with the publication of the Unua Libro on 26 July 1887 marking the beginning of its wider usage. Like all other non-basic Latin letters in the Esperanto alphabet, it was inspired by Western Slavic Latin alphabets (e.g. Czech), but uses a circumflex instead of a caron — most likely to make the orthography appear more international (i.e. less Slavic) and more compatible with French typewriters, which were in general use at the time and had a dead key for the circumflex, allowing it to be typed over any character.

=== Reported end ===
⟨Ĥ⟩ was always the least frequent letter in Esperanto orthography, (Note: Although 'Ĥ' usually has more dictionary entries than the letter 'Ĵ', ⟨ĵ⟩ is part of the common -aĵo suffix, which is why it occurs more frequently.) occurring mostly in words with Greek etymologies, where it represented a Romanized chi (in fact its name in the Kalocsay abecedary, ĥi, was most likely inspired by this usage). Since chi is pronounced [k] in most languages, neologistic equivalents soon appeared using ⟨k⟩ instead, being easier to pronounce by most European speakers and the resulting word sounding more similar to their native equivalent (especially in Fundamento de Esperanto's English and French languages), such as teĥniko → tekniko ("technology") and ĥemio → kemio ("chemistry"). These additions and replacements came very early and were in general use by World War I.

Since then, the end of ⟨ĥ⟩ has been often discussed, but has never really happened. In modern times (post-World War II), no new coinages intended to replace words with ⟨ĥ⟩ in them have seen general use, with the notable of exception of koruso for ĥoro ("chorus"). Some other replacements followed different patterns, such as ĥino → ĉino ("Chinese [person]").

Several words commonly use ⟨ĥ⟩, particularly those not derived from Greek words (ĥano ("khan"), ĥoto ("jota"), Liĥtenŝtejno ("Liechtenstein"), etc.) or those in which there is another word that uses "k" in that context. The latter include:

- eĥo ("echo") ≠ eko ("beginning")
- ĉeĥo ("Czech") ≠ ĉeko ("bank check")
- ĥoro ("chorus") ≠ koro ("heart") ≠ horo ("hour")

== Other uses ==
- A 'Ĥ' was used in the stage name of the 1980s Italo disco singer CĤATO.
- In quantum mechanics, the Hamiltonian of a system is typically denoted by $\hat{H}$ (where the hat indicates that it is an operator), especially in the Wheeler–DeWitt equation.

== Computing codes ==
Character information
Preview	Ĥ		ĥ	
Unicode name	LATIN CAPITAL LETTER H WITH CIRCUMFLEX		LATIN SMALL LETTER H WITH CIRCUMFLEX	
Encodings	decimal	hex	dec	hex
Unicode	292	U+0124	293	U+0125
UTF-8	196 164	C4 A4	196 165	C4 A5
Numeric character reference	&#292;	&#x124;	&#293;	&#x125;
Named character reference	&Hcirc;		&hcirc;	

== See also ==
- Ĉ, Ĝ, Ĵ, Ŝ, Ŭ – the other non-basic Latin letters of the Esperanto alphabet
- Ħ
