= Ĝ =

Latin letter G with circumflex

G with circumflex
- Ĝ ĝ
- Gx gx, Gh gh

Usage
- Writing system: Latin
- Type: alphabetic
- Language of origin: Esperanto, Aleut language, Khinalug language, Toba Qom language, Haida language
- Sound values: [dʒ]; [dʐ]; [ɖʐ]; [g]; [ŋ]; [ʁ]; [gː]
- In Unicode: U+011C, U+011D

History
Development
(speculated origin)
  T14
          - Γ γ
            - 𐌂
              - C c
                - G g
                  - Ĝ ĝ
- Transliterations: Г̑ г̑, Ӷ ӷ, Гг гг
- Variations: Gx gx, Gh gh

Other
- Writing direction: Left to right

Ĝ or ĝ (G circumflex) is a consonant in Esperanto orthography, representing a voiced postalveolar affricate (either palato-alveolar or retroflex), and is equivalent to a voiced postalveolar affricate /dʒ/ or a voiced retroflex affricate /dʐ/.

While Esperanto orthography uses a diacritic for its four postalveolar consonants, as do the Latin-based Slavic alphabets, the base letters are Romano-Germanic. Ĝ is based on the letter g, which has this sound in English and Italian before the vowels i and e (with some exceptions in English), to better preserve the shape of borrowings from those languages (such as ĝenerala from general) than Slavic đ (Serbo-Croatian) or dž would.

Ĝ is the ninth letter in Esperanto orthography. Although it is written as gx and gh respectively in the x-system and h-system workarounds, it is normally written as G with a circumflex: ĝ.

== Uses of ⟨Ĝ⟩ in other languages ==
In Haida, a language isolate, the letter ⟨ĝ⟩ was sometimes used to represent pharyngeal voiced fricative /ʕ/.

In Aleut, an Eskaleut language, ⟨ĝ⟩ represents a voiced uvular fricative /ʁ/. The corresponding voiceless Aleut sound is represented by x̂.

In Dutch, the letter ⟨ĝ⟩ is used in some phrase books and dictionaries for pronunciation help. It represents a plosive [ɡ], because ⟨g⟩ is pronounced as a fricative /ɣ/ in Dutch.

In some transcriptions of Sumerian, ⟨ĝ⟩ is used to represent the velar nasal /ŋ/.

== Character mappings ==
Character information
Preview	Ĝ		ĝ	
Unicode name	LATIN CAPITAL LETTER G WITH CIRCUMFLEX		LATIN SMALL LETTER G WITH CIRCUMFLEX	
Encodings	decimal	hex	dec	hex
Unicode	284	U+011C	285	U+011D
UTF-8	196 156	C4 9C	196 157	C4 9D
Numeric character reference	&#284;	&#x11C;	&#285;	&#x11D;
Named character reference	&Gcirc;		&gcirc;	

== See also ==
- p
- Ĥ
- Ĵ
- Ŝ
- Ŭ
