= Ĵ =

Latin letter J with circumflex

J with circumflex
- Ĵ ĵ
- Jh jh, Jx jx

Usage
- Writing system: Latin script
- Type: Alphabet
- Language of origin: Esperanto
- Sound values: [ʒ]
- In Unicode: U+0134 U+0135
- Alphabetical position: 14

History
Development
D36
          - Ιι
            - 𐌉
              - I i
                - J j ȷ
                  - Ĵ ĵ
- Time period: 1887 to present
- Variations: Jh jh, Jx jx

Other
- Writing direction: Left-to-right

Ĵ or ĵ (J circumflex) is a letter in Esperanto orthography representing the sound [ʒ].

While Esperanto orthography uses a diacritic for its four postalveolar consonants, as do the Latin-based Slavic alphabets, the base letters are Romano-Germanic. Ĵ is based on the French pronunciation of the letter j to better preserve the shape of borrowings from that language (such as ĵurnalo from journal) than Slavic ž would.

Ĵ is the fourteenth letter in Esperanto orthography. Although it is written as jx and jh respectively in the x-system and h-system workarounds, it is normally written as J with a circumflex: ĵ.

Ĵ is used in the Persian Latin (Rumi) alphabet, equivalent to ژ.

== Usage ==
=== In mathematics ===
- The letter ĵ is often used to denote a unit vector in mathematics and physics for representing y-vector.

== Character mappings ==
Character information
Preview	Ĵ		ĵ	
Unicode name	LATIN CAPITAL LETTER J WITH CIRCUMFLEX		LATIN SMALL LETTER J WITH CIRCUMFLEX	
Encodings	decimal	hex	dec	hex
Unicode	308	U+0134	309	U+0135
UTF-8	196 180	C4 B4	196 181	C4 B5
Numeric character reference	&#308;	&#x134;	&#309;	&#x135;
Named character reference	&Jcirc;		&jcirc;	

== See also ==
- Ĉ
- Ĝ
- Ĥ
- Ŝ
- Ŭ
