= ISO basic Latin alphabet =

26 letters in two cases broadly used in international communication

The ISO basic Latin alphabet is an international standard (beginning with ISO/IEC 646) for a Latin-script alphabet that consists of two sets (uppercase and lowercase) of 26 letters, codified in various national and international standards and used widely in international communication. They are the same letters that comprise the current English alphabet. Since medieval times, they are also the same letters of the modern Latin alphabet. The order is also important for sorting words into alphabetical order.

The two sets contain the following 26 letters each:

ISO basic Latin alphabet
Uppercase letter set	A	B	C	D	E	F	G	H	I	J	K	L	M	N	O	P	Q	R	S	T	U	V	W	X	Y	Z
Lowercase letter set	a	b	c	d	e	f	g	h	i	j	k	l	m	n	o	p	q	r	s	t	u	v	w	x	y	z

== History ==
By the 1960s it became apparent to the computer and telecommunications industries in the First World that a non-proprietary method of encoding characters was needed. The International Organization for Standardization (ISO) encapsulated the Latin script in their (ISO/IEC 646) 7-bit character-encoding standard. To achieve widespread acceptance, this encapsulation was based on popular usage. The standard was based on the already published American Standard Code for Information Interchange, better known as ASCII, which included in the character set the 26 × 2 letters of the English alphabet. Later standards issued by the ISO, for example ISO/IEC 8859 (8-bit character encoding) and ISO/IEC 10646 (Unicode Latin), have continued to define the 26 × 2 letters of the English alphabet as the basic Latin script with extensions to handle other letters in other languages.

== Terminology ==
The Unicode block that contains the alphabet is called "C0 Controls and Basic Latin". Two subheadings exist:

- "Uppercase Latin alphabet": the letters start at U+0041 and contain the string LATIN CAPITAL LETTER in their descriptions
- "Lowercase Latin alphabet": the letters start at U+0061 and contain the string LATIN SMALL LETTER in their descriptions

There are also another two sets in the Halfwidth and Fullwidth Forms block:

- Uppercase: the letters start at U+FF21 and contain the string FULLWIDTH LATIN CAPITAL LETTER in their descriptions
- Lowercase: the letters start at U+FF41 and contain the string FULLWIDTH LATIN SMALL LETTER in their descriptions

== Timeline for encoding standards ==
- 1865 International Morse Code was standardized at the International Telegraphy Congress in Paris, and was later made the standard by the International Telecommunication Union (ITU)
- 1950s Radiotelephony Spelling Alphabet by ICAO

=== Timeline for widely used computer codes supporting the alphabet ===
- 1963: ASCII (7-bit character-encoding standard from the American Standards Association, which became the American National Standards Institute in 1969)
- 1963/1964: EBCDIC (developed by IBM and supporting the same alphabetic characters as ASCII, but with different code values)
- 1965-04-30: Ratified by ECMA as ECMA-6 based on work the ECMA's Technical Committee TC1 had carried out since December 1960.
- 1972: ISO 646 (ISO 7-bit character-encoding standard, using the same alphabetic code values as ASCII, revised in second edition ISO 646:1983 and third edition ISO/IEC 646:1991 as a joint ISO/IEC standard)
- 1983: ITU-T Rec. T.51 | ISO/IEC 6937 (a multi-byte extension of ASCII)
- 1987: ISO/IEC 8859-1:1987 (8-bit character encoding)
  - Subsequently, other versions and parts of ISO/IEC 8859 have been published.
- Mid-to-late 1980s: Windows-1250, Windows-1252, and other encodings used in Microsoft Windows (some roughly similar to ISO/IEC 8859-1)
- 1990: Unicode 1.0 (developed by the Unicode Consortium), contained in the block "C0 Controls and Basic Latin" using the same alphabetic code values as ASCII and ISO/IEC 646
  - Subsequently, other versions of Unicode have been published and it later became a joint ISO/IEC standard as well, as identified below.
- 1993: ISO/IEC 10646-1:1993, ISO/IEC standard for characters in Unicode 1.1
  - Subsequently, other versions of ISO/IEC 10646-1 and one of ISO/IEC 10646-2 have been published. Since 2003, the standards have been published under the name "ISO/IEC 10646" without the separation into two parts.
- 1997: Windows Glyph List 4

== Representation ==
The uppercase letters of the ISO basic Latin alphabet on a 16-segment display (plus the Arabic numerals).

In ASCII the letters belong to the printable characters and in Unicode since version 1.0 they belong to the block "C0 Controls and Basic Latin". In both cases, as well as in ISO/IEC 646, ISO/IEC 8859 and ISO/IEC 10646 they are occupying the positions in hexadecimal notation 41 to 5A for uppercase and 61 to 7A for lowercase.

Not case sensitive, all letters have code words in the ICAO spelling alphabet and can be represented with Morse code.

== Usage ==
All of the lowercase letters are used in the International Phonetic Alphabet (IPA). In X-SAMPA and SAMPA these letters have the same sound value as in IPA.

=== Alphabets containing the same set of letters ===
The list below only includes alphabets that include all the 26 letters but exclude:

- letters whose diacritical marks make them distinct letters.
- multigraphs that constitute distinct letters.
- ligatures that are distinct letters.

Notable omissions due to these rules include Spanish, Esperanto, Filipino and German. The German alphabet is sometimes considered by tradition to contain only 26 letters (with ⟨ä⟩, ⟨ö⟩, ⟨ü⟩ considered variants and ⟨ß⟩ considered a ligature of ⟨ſ⟩ (long s) and ⟨s⟩), but the current German orthographic rules include ⟨ä⟩, ⟨ö⟩, ⟨ü⟩, ⟨ß⟩ in the alphabet placed after ⟨Z⟩. In Spanish orthography, the letters ⟨n⟩ and ⟨ñ⟩ are distinct; the tilde is not considered a diacritic in this case.

Alphabet	Diacritic	Multigraphs (not constituting distinct letters)	Ligatures
Afrikaans alphabet	á, ä, é, è, ê, ë, í, î, ï, ó, ô, ö, ú, û, ü, ý	Digraphs: ⟨aa⟩, ⟨ai⟩, ⟨ch⟩, ⟨ee⟩, ⟨ei⟩, ⟨eu⟩, ⟨gh⟩, ⟨ie⟩, ⟨nj⟩, ⟨ng⟩ ⟨oe⟩, ⟨oi⟩, ⟨oo⟩, ⟨ou⟩, ⟨sj⟩, ⟨tj⟩, ⟨ts⟩, ⟨ui⟩, ⟨uu⟩ Trigraphs: ⟨aai⟩, ⟨eeu⟩, ⟨oei⟩, ⟨ooi⟩	ŉ (N‑apostrophe)
Aragonese alphabet (Academia de l'Aragonés orthography)	á, é, í, ó, ú, ü, lꞏl	⟨ch⟩, ⟨gu⟩, ⟨ll⟩, ⟨ny⟩, ⟨qu⟩, ⟨rr⟩, ⟨tz⟩	
Catalan alphabet	à, é, è, í, ï, ó, ò, ú, ü, ç, lꞏl	⟨gu⟩, ⟨ig⟩, ⟨ix⟩, ⟨ll⟩, ⟨ny⟩, ⟨qu⟩, ⟨rr⟩, ⟨ss⟩	
Dutch alphabet	ä, é, è, ë, ï, ö, ü	The digraph ⟨ij⟩ is sometimes considered to be a separate letter. When that is the case, it usually replaces or is intermixed with ⟨y⟩. Other digraphs: ⟨aa⟩, ⟨ae⟩, ⟨ai⟩, ⟨au⟩, ⟨ch⟩, ⟨ee⟩, ⟨ei⟩, ⟨eu⟩, ⟨ie⟩, ⟨oe⟩, ⟨oi⟩, ⟨oo⟩, ⟨ou⟩, ⟨ui⟩, ⟨uu⟩	
English alphabet	only in loanwords (see below)^{1}	⟨sh⟩, ⟨ch⟩, ⟨ea⟩, ⟨ou⟩, ⟨th⟩, ⟨ph⟩, ⟨ng⟩	æ, œ (both archaic)
French alphabet	à, â, ç, é, è, ê, ë, î, ï, ô, ù, û, ü, ÿ	⟨ai⟩, ⟨au⟩, ⟨ei⟩, ⟨eu⟩, ⟨oi⟩, ⟨ou⟩, ⟨eau⟩, ⟨ch⟩, ⟨ph⟩, ⟨gn⟩, ⟨an⟩, ⟨am⟩, ⟨en⟩, ⟨em⟩, ⟨in⟩, ⟨im⟩, ⟨on⟩, ⟨om⟩, ⟨un⟩, ⟨um⟩, ⟨yn⟩, ⟨ym⟩, ⟨ain⟩, ⟨aim⟩, ⟨ein⟩, ⟨oin⟩, ⟨aî⟩, ⟨eî⟩	æ (rare), œ (mandatory)
Hmong Latin alphabet	none	⟨bh⟩, ⟨bl⟩, ⟨ch⟩, ⟨dh⟩, ⟨dl⟩, ⟨gh⟩, ⟨hl⟩, ⟨hm⟩, ⟨hn⟩, ⟨jh⟩, ⟨kh⟩, ⟨ml⟩, ⟨nc⟩, ⟨nq⟩, ⟨nr⟩, ⟨nt⟩, ⟨nx⟩, ⟨ny⟩, ⟨ph⟩, ⟨pl⟩, ⟨qh⟩, ⟨rh⟩, ⟨th⟩, ⟨ts⟩, ⟨tx⟩, ⟨xy⟩, ⟨bhl⟩, ⟨dhl⟩, ⟨hml⟩, ⟨hny⟩, ⟨nch⟩, ⟨ndl⟩, ⟨ngh⟩, ⟨nrh⟩, ⟨nth⟩, ⟨nxh⟩, ⟨phl⟩, ⟨tsh⟩, ⟨txh⟩, ⟨ndhl⟩	
Italian alphabet (extended) (Note: The Italian alphabet is traditionally considered to have only 21 letters, excluding j, k, w, x, y. However, in practice these letters occur in a number of loanwords. J also occurs in some native Italian proper names as a variant of writing semivocalic i.)	à, è, é, ì, î (formal), ò, ó, ù	⟨ch⟩, ⟨ci⟩, ⟨gh⟩, ⟨gi⟩, ⟨gl⟩, ⟨gli⟩, ⟨gn⟩, ⟨sc⟩, ⟨sci⟩	
Ido alphabet*	none	⟨qu⟩, ⟨ch⟩, ⟨sh⟩	
Indonesian alphabet	only in learning materials (see below)^{4}	⟨kh⟩, ⟨ng⟩, ⟨ny⟩, ⟨sy⟩, diphthongs: ⟨ai⟩, ⟨au⟩, ⟨ei⟩, ⟨oi⟩	
Interlingua alphabet*	only in unassimilated loanwords (see below)^{2}	⟨ch⟩, ⟨ph⟩, ⟨qu⟩, ⟨rh⟩, ⟨sh⟩	
Javanese Latin alphabet	é, è	⟨dh⟩, ⟨kh⟩, ⟨ng⟩, ⟨ny⟩, ⟨sy⟩, ⟨th⟩	
Latino sine flexione alphabet*	only an optional accent for unusual stress (see below)^{3}	⟨ae⟩, ⟨ch⟩, ⟨oe⟩, ⟨ph⟩, ⟨qu⟩, ⟨rh⟩, ⟨th⟩	
Luxembourgish alphabet	ä, é, ë	⟨aa⟩, ⟨ch⟩, ⟨ck⟩, ⟨ee⟩, ⟨ei⟩, ⟨ie⟩, ⟨ii⟩, ⟨ng⟩, ⟨oo⟩, ⟨ou⟩, ⟨qu⟩, ⟨ue⟩, ⟨uu⟩, ⟨sch⟩	
Malay alphabet	only in learning materials (see below)^{4}	⟨gh⟩, ⟨kh⟩, ⟨ng⟩, ⟨ny⟩, ⟨sy⟩	
Portuguese alphabet (Note: Note for Portuguese: k and y (but not w) were part of the alphabet until several spelling reforms during the 20th century, the aim of which was to change the etymological Portuguese spelling into an easier phonetic spelling. These letters were replaced by other letters having the same sound: thus psychologia became psicologia, kioske became quiosque, martyr became mártir, etc. Nowadays k, w, and y are only found in foreign words and their derived terms and in scientific abbreviations (e.g. km, byronismo). These letters are considered part of the alphabet again following the 1990 Portuguese Language Orthographic Agreement, which came into effect on January 1, 2009, in Brazil. See Reforms of Portuguese orthography.)	ã, õ, á, é, í, ó, ú, â, ê, ô, à, ç	⟨ch⟩, ⟨lh⟩, ⟨nh⟩, ⟨rr⟩, ⟨ss⟩, ⟨am⟩, ⟨em⟩, ⟨im⟩, ⟨om⟩, ⟨um⟩, ⟨ãe⟩, ⟨ão⟩, ⟨õe⟩	
Sundanese Latin alphabet	é	⟨eu⟩, ⟨ng⟩, ⟨ny⟩	
Xhosa alphabet	only in learning materials (see below)^{5}	⟨bh⟩, ⟨ch⟩, ⟨dl⟩, ⟨dy⟩, ⟨dz⟩, ⟨gc⟩, ⟨gq⟩, ⟨gr⟩, ⟨gx⟩, ⟨hh⟩, ⟨hl⟩, ⟨kh⟩, ⟨kr⟩, ⟨krh⟩, ⟨lh⟩, ⟨mh⟩, ⟨nc⟩, ⟨ng⟩, ⟨ngʼ⟩, ⟨ngc⟩, ⟨ngh⟩, ⟨ngq⟩, ⟨ngx⟩, ⟨nh⟩, ⟨nkc⟩, ⟨nkq⟩, ⟨nkx⟩, ⟨nq⟩, ⟨nx⟩, ⟨ny⟩, ⟨nyh⟩, ⟨ph⟩, ⟨qh⟩, ⟨rh⟩, ⟨sh⟩, ⟨th⟩, ⟨ths⟩, ⟨thsh⟩, ⟨ts⟩, ⟨tsh⟩, ⟨ty⟩, ⟨tyh⟩, ⟨wh⟩, ⟨xh⟩, ⟨yh⟩, ⟨zh⟩	
Zulu alphabet	none	⟨bh⟩, ⟨ch⟩, ⟨dl⟩, ⟨dy⟩, ⟨gc⟩, ⟨gq⟩, ⟨gx⟩, ⟨hh⟩, ⟨hl⟩, ⟨kh⟩, ⟨kl⟩, ⟨mb⟩, ⟨nc⟩, ⟨ng⟩, ⟨ngc⟩, ⟨ngq⟩, ⟨ngx⟩, ⟨nj⟩, ⟨nk⟩, ⟨nq⟩, ⟨ntsh⟩, ⟨nx⟩, ⟨ny⟩, ⟨ph⟩, ⟨qh⟩, ⟨sh⟩, ⟨th⟩, ⟨ts⟩, ⟨tsh⟩, ⟨xh⟩	

* Constructed languages

1. English is one of the few modern European languages requiring no diacritics for native words (although a diaeresis is used by some American publishers in words such as "coöperation"). (Note: As an example of an article containing a diaeresis in "coöperate", as well as accents on loan words in English, such as a cedilla in "façades" and a circumflex in the word "crêpe", see Grafton, Anthony (October 23, 2006). "Books: The Nutty Professors, The history of academic charisma". The New Yorker.)
2. Interlingua, a constructed language, never uses diacritics except in unassimilated loanwords. However, they can be removed if they are not used to modify the vowel (e.g. cafe, from French: café).
3. Latino sine flexione, a.k.a. "Peano's Interlingua", allows but does not require the placement of an accent for unusual stress. (It antedates the other "Interlingua" by roughly four decades.)
4. Malay and Indonesian (based on Malay) use all the Latin alphabet and require no diacritics and ligatures. However, Malay and Indonesian learning materials may use ⟨é⟩ (E with acute) to clarify the pronunciation of the letter E; in that case, ⟨e⟩ is pronounced /ə/ while ⟨é⟩ is pronounced /e/ and (è) is pronounced /ɛ/. Many of the 700+ languages of Indonesia also use the Indonesian alphabet to write their languages, some—such as Javanese—adding diacritics é and è, and some omitting q, x, and z.
5. Xhosa is usually written without diacritics, but may optionally use diacritics over ⟨a, e, i, o, u⟩ for tones: ⟨à, á, â, ä⟩.

=== Column numbering ===
The Roman (Latin) alphabet is commonly used for column numbering in a table or chart. This avoids confusion with row numbers using Arabic numerals. For example, a 3-by-3 table would contain columns A, B, and C, set against rows 1, 2, and 3. If more columns are needed beyond Z (normally the final letter of the alphabet), the column immediately after Z is AA, followed by AB, and so on (see bijective base-26 system). This can be seen by scrolling far to the right in a spreadsheet program such as Microsoft Excel or LibreOffice Calc.

The letters are often used for indexing nested bullet points. In this case after the 26th it is more common to use AA, BB, CC, ... instead of base-26 numbers.

== See also ==
- Hebrew alphabet
- Greek alphabet
- Latin alphabet
  - Latin-script alphabet for the sound correspondence
  - List of Latin-script alphabets
- Early Cyrillic alphabet, Cyrillic alphabets
- Windows code pages
