= Multigraph (orthography) =

Sequence of letters that behaves as a unit, not as a sequence of parts

A multigraph, or pleograph, is a sequence of letters that behaves as a unit and is not the sum of its parts, such as English ⟨ch⟩ (typically pronounced /tʃ/) or French ⟨eau⟩ (pronounced [o]). The term is infrequently used, as the number of letters is usually specified:

2. Digraph – two, as English ⟨ch⟩ or ⟨ea⟩
3. Trigraph – three, as French ⟨eau⟩ and Italian ⟨gli⟩
4. Tetragraph – four, as German ⟨tsch⟩ and Dutch ⟨ieuw⟩
5. Pentagraph – five, as Avar ⟨чӀчӀв⟩ and Archi ⟨ххьӏв⟩
6. Hexagraph – six, as Irish ⟨oidhea⟩ or ⟨eamhai⟩
7. Heptagraph – seven, as German ⟨schtsch⟩ and Juu ⟨dtsʼkxʼ⟩ (theoretically, see below)

Some multigraphs are considered ligatures, or letters unto themselves, such as ⟨ij⟩ in Dutch, ⟨dzs⟩ in Hungarian, and ⟨dž⟩ in Serbo-Croatian and a few other Slavic languages.

Combinations longer than tetragraphs are unusual. The German pentagraph ⟨tzsch⟩ has largely been replaced by ⟨tsch⟩, remaining only in proper names such as ⟨Pönitzsch⟩ or ⟨Nietzsche⟩. Except for doubled trigraphs like German ⟨schsch⟩, hexagraphs are found only in Irish vowels, where the outside letters indicate whether the neighbouring consonant is "broad" or "slender". However, these sequences are not predictable. The hexagraph ⟨oidhea⟩, for example, where the ⟨o⟩ and ⟨a⟩ mark the consonants as broad, represents the same sound (approximately the vowel in English write) as the trigraph ⟨adh⟩, and with the same effect on neighbouring consonants.

== Heptagraphs ==
Heptagraphs are extremely rare. Most fixed seven-letter sequences are composed of shorter multigraphs with a predictable result. The German sequence ⟨schtsch⟩, used to transliterate Ukrainian ⟨щ⟩, as in ⟨Borschtsch⟩ for ⟨борщ⟩ "borscht", is a sequence of a trigraph ⟨sch⟩ and a tetragraph ⟨tsch⟩ rather than a heptagraph. Likewise, the Juu languages have been claimed to have a heptagraph ⟨dts’kx’⟩, but this is also a sequence, of ⟨dts’⟩ and ⟨kx’⟩.

Beyond the Latin alphabet, Morse code uses hexagraphs for several punctuation marks, and the dollar sign ⟨$⟩ is a heptagraph, ⟨· · · — · · —⟩. Longer sequences in Morse are considered ligatures, and transcribed as such in the Latin alphabet.

== See also ==
- Unigraph (orthography)
