= List of Latin-script pentagraphs =

In the Latin script, pentagraphs are found primarily in Irish orthography. There is one archaic pentagraph in German orthography, which is found in the English words Nietzschean and derivatives (Nietzscheanism, Nietzscheanist, Nietzscheism, Nietzscheist).

== Examples ==
=== Irish ===
Used between a velarized ("broad") and a palatalized ("slender") consonant:

⟨abhai⟩, ⟨obhai⟩, ⟨odhai⟩, and ⟨oghai⟩ are used to write /əu̯/ (like RP 'oa' in 'goat'; /oː/ in Ulster)

⟨amhai⟩ is used to write /əu̯/

⟨adhai⟩ and ⟨aghai⟩ are used to write /əi̯/ (/eː/ in Ulster)

⟨aidhe⟩, ⟨aighe⟩, ⟨oidhi⟩, ⟨oidhe⟩, ⟨oighi⟩ and ⟨oidhe⟩ are used to write /əi̯/

⟨omhai⟩ is used to write /oː/

⟨umhai⟩ is used to write /uː/

Used between a slender and a broad consonant:

⟨eabha⟩ and ⟨eobha⟩ used to write /əu̯/ (/oː/ in Ulster)

⟨eamha⟩ is used to write /əu̯/

⟨eadha⟩ and ⟨eagha⟩ are used to write /əi̯/ (/eː/ in Ulster)

⟨eomha⟩ is used to write /oː/

Used between two slender consonants:

⟨eidhi⟩ and ⟨eighi⟩ are used to write /əi̯/:

=== Dutch ===
⟨sjtsj⟩ is used as the transcription of the Cyrillic letter Щ, representing the consonant /ɕː/ in Russian, for example in the name Chroesjtsjov.

=== English ===
⟨augha⟩ is used in the English names Gaughan and Vaughan to represent the sound /ɔː/.

=== French ===
⟨chtch⟩ is used as the transcription of the Cyrillic letter Щ, representing the consonant /ɕː/ in Russian, for example in the name Khrouchtchev.

⟨cques⟩ is pronounced as /k(ə)/ when the silent plural suffix -s is added to the tetragraph cque and in the proper name Jacques.

=== German ===
⟨tzsch⟩ was once used in German to write the sound /tʃ/ (ch as in cheese). It has largely been replaced by the tetragraph ⟨tsch⟩, but is still found in proper names such as Tzschirner, Nietzsche, Fritzsche, and Delitzsch.

=== St. Lawrence Island Yupik ===
⟨ngngw⟩ is used in the variant of Central Siberian Yupik language spoken on St. Lawrence Island to write the sound /ŋ̊ʷ/ i.e. the labialized version of the voiceless velar nasal. Example: "naangngwaaghaquq" ('he/she/it is swimming').
