= Hexagraph =

A hexagraph (from the Greek: ἕξ, héx, "six" and γράφω, gráphō, "write") is a sequence of six letters used to represent a single sound (phoneme), or a combination of sounds that do not correspond to the individual values of the letters. They occur in Irish orthography, and many of them can be analysed as a tetragraph followed by the vowels ⟨e⟩ or ⟨i⟩ on either side to indicate that the neighbouring consonants are palatalized ("slender"). However, not all Irish hexagraphs are analysable that way. The hexagraph ⟨oidhea⟩, for example, represents the same sound (approximately the vowel in English "write") as the trigraph adh, and with the same effect on neighboring consonants.

English does not have hexagraphs. The six-letter sequence ⟨schsch⟩ appears in German; for example, in the name Eschscholtz (and thus is the scientific name Eschscholzia of the California poppy). However, this is a doubling of the trigraph ⟨sch⟩ to indicate that the preceding vowel is short rather than itself being a hexagraph.

== List of hexagraphs ==
=== Irish hexagraphs ===
⟨eabhai⟩ is used to write /əu̯/ (/oː/ in Ulster), e.g. breabhaid "sortie", deabhaidh "haste, skirmish", feabhais "improvement" (gen), leabhair "books", meabhair "minds".

⟨eadhai⟩ is used to write /əi̯/ (/eː/ in Ulster), e.g. feadhain "troop", Gairmleadhaigh "Gormley" (surname), ghleadhair "struck".

⟨eamhai⟩ is used to write /əu̯/, e.g. creamhaigh "garlic" (gen), sceamhaim "I bark", seamhain "semiology", sleamhain "slippery", teamhair "tor, hill".

⟨eidhea⟩ and ⟨eighea⟩ are both used to write /əi̯/ (/eː/ in Ulster), e.g. eidheann "ivy", feidheartha "penniless", leigheas "healing", deideigheanna "soft toys", deighealfaidh "will divide".

⟨oidhea⟩ and ⟨oighea⟩ are both used to write /əi̯/, e.g. oidheanna "fates", sroigheall "scourge", broigheall "cormorant", oigheann "oven", oighear "ice", poigheachán "(snail)shell".

⟨eomhai⟩ is used to write /oː/, e.g. cheomhair "foggy" (gen.).

⟨iumhai⟩ is used to write /uː/, e.g. ciumhais "edge".

== See also ==
- Multigraph
- Digraph
- Pentagraph
- Heptagraph
- List of Latin-script letters
