= EQH =

EQH or eqh can refer to:

- Equitable Holdings, an American finance and insurance company, by NYSE stock ticker
- Eqh (trigraph), a combination of three letters used to transcribe a sound in the Taa language of Botswana and Namibia
