= OMHA (disambiguation) =

The Ontario Minor Hockey Association is a minor ice hockey governing body in Ontario.

OMHA may also refer to:

- Mental Health Act (Ontario)
- ⟨omha⟩, an Irish tetragraph
