= Basic Latin alphabet =

Basic Latin alphabet may refer to:

- Classical Latin alphabet
- ISO basic Latin alphabet, a codified standard for a 26-letter alphabet
