= Trigraph of Christ =

1452 lunette by Andrea Mantegna

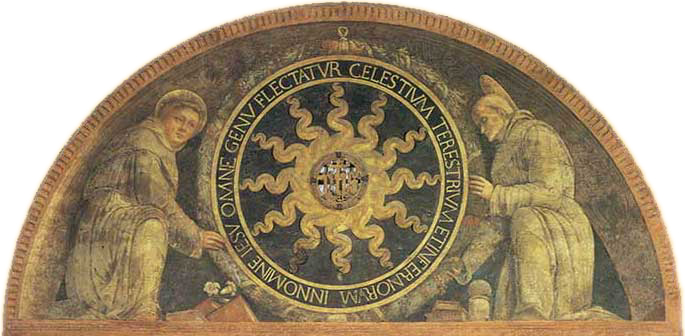
Trigraph of Christ

Trigraph of Christ is a fresco fragment by Andrea Mantegna, dated to 1452. It was originally above the main doorway of Basilica of Saint Anthony of Padua and is now in the city's Museo Antoniano. It shows Christ represented by the trigraph 'IHS', between Antony of Padua (left) and Bernardino of Siena (right).

== Bibliography ==
- Ettore Camesasca, 'Mantegna', in AA.VV., Pittori del Rinascimento, Scala, Firenze 2007. ISBN 88-8117-099-X
