= TXH =

TXH or txh can refer to:

- Bell Textron, an American aerospace manufacturer (ICAO code: TXH).
- Thracian language, an extinct language spoken in south eastern Europe (ISO 639-3 code: txh).
- txh (trigraph), a trigraph used for /tsʰ/ in the Romanized Popular Alphabet used to write Hmong.
