= DSCH =

DSCH may stand for:

- DSCH motif, a musical motif used by the Soviet composer Dmitri Shostakovich to represent himself. DSCH is also the name of a journal and a publishing house devoted to the composer.
  - Concerto DSCH, a ballet made by Alexei Ratmansky on New York City Ballet to Shostakovich's Concerto No. 2 in F Major, Op. 102.
- dsch, a tetragraph used in the German language to transcribe the /d͡ʒ/ phoneme.
