= Heptagraph =

A heptagraph (from Ancient Greek: ἑπτά, heptá 'seven' and γράφω, gráphō 'write') is a sequence of seven letters used to represent a single sound (phoneme), or a combination of sounds, that do not correspond to the individual values of the letters.

Heptagraphs are extremely rare. Most other fixed sequences of seven letters are composed of shorter multigraphs with a predictable result. The seven-letter German sequence ⟨schtsch⟩, used to transliterate the Russian and Ukrainian letter ⟨щ⟩, as in ⟨Borschtsch⟩ [bɔʁʃtʃ] for Russian/Ukrainian ⟨борщ⟩ (Russian: [borɕː], Ukrainian: [bɔrʃtʃ]) "borscht", is a sequence of a trigraph ⟨sch⟩ [ʃ] and a tetragraph ⟨tsch⟩ [t͡ʃ]. Likewise, the Juu languages have been claimed to have a heptagraph ⟨dtsʼkxʼ⟩, but this is also a sequence, of ⟨dtsʼ⟩ and ⟨kxʼ⟩.

Another theoretical example of a heptagraph would be the traditional Irish spelling oidhche 'night' for modern oíche, but only for the pronunciation /iː/ as found in the Cois Fharraige dialect.

== See also ==
- Multigraph (orthography)
- Digraph (orthography)
- Tetragraph
- Pentagraph
- Hexagraph
