= Pentagraph =

Sequence of five letters representing a sound or set of sounds

A pentagraph (from the Greek: πέντε, pénte, "five" and γράφω, gráphō, "write") is a sequence of five letters used to represent a single sound (phoneme), or a combination of sounds, that do not correspond to the individual values of the letters. In German, for example, the pentagraph tzsch represents the [tʃ] sound of the English digraph ch, and indeed is found in the English word Nietzschean. Irish has several pentagraphs.

== Latin-script pentagraphs ==
List of Latin-script pentagraphs

== Cyrillic-script pentagraphs ==
In Cyrillic used for languages of the Caucasus, there are a couple five-letter sequences used for 'strong' (typically transcribed in the IPA as geminate, and doubled in Cyrillic) labialized consonants. Since both features are predictable from the orthography, their pentagraph status is dubious.

The pentagraph ⟨ххьӏв⟩ is used in Archi for [χːˤʷ]: a labialized ⟨ххьӏ⟩ [χːˤ], which is the 'strong' counterpart of the pharyngealized voiceless uvular fricative ([χˤ]), written using the trigraph ⟨хьӏ⟩, whose graph is in turn an unpredictable derivation of ⟨х⟩ ([χ]) and thus a true trigraph. It occurs, for example, in the word ххьIвелтIбос ("rummage through someone else's things").

== See also ==
- Trigraph
- Tetragraph
- Hexagraph
- Heptagraph
