= List of Latin-script tetragraphs =

This is a list of quadrigraphs in the Latin script. These are most common in Irish orthography. For Cyrillic quadrigraphs, see quadrigraph.

== Arrernte ==
Quadrigraphs in Arrernte transcribe single consonants, but are largely predictable from their components.

⟨kngw⟩ represents /ᵏŋʷ/.

⟨rtnw⟩ represents /^{ʈ}ɳʷ/.

⟨thnw⟩ and ⟨tnhw⟩ represent /ᵗ̪n̪ʷ/.

⟨tnyw⟩ represents /ᶜɲʷ/.

== English ==
The majority of English quadrigraphs make vowel sounds:

⟨aigh⟩ represents /eɪ/, as in straight.

⟨aire⟩ represents /ɛː/ in Received Pronunciation (RP), as in millionaire.

⟨arre⟩ can represent /ɑː/ in RP, as in bizarre.

⟨arrh⟩ represents /ɑː/ in RP, as in catarrh.

⟨augh⟩ can represent /ɔː/, as in caught.

⟨ayer⟩ can represent /ɛː/ in RP, as in prayer.

⟨ayor⟩ represents /ɛː/ in RP, as in mayor.

⟨eigh⟩ can represent three different sounds: /eɪ/ as in weigh, /aɪ/ as in height, and /iː/ as in Leigh.

⟨ough⟩ has ten possible pronunciations, five of which make vowel sounds: /aʊ/ as in drought, /ɔː/ as in bought, /oʊ/ as in though, /uː/ as in through, and /ə/ as in thorough.

⟨ueue⟩ represents /juː/, as in queue.

⟨yrrh⟩ represents /ɜː/ in RP, as in myrrh.

There are four examples of vowel quadrigraphs that are found only in proper nouns:

⟨eare⟩ represents /ɪə/ in RP, as found in Shakespeare.

⟨orce⟩ represents /ʊ/ in RP, as found in Worcestershire.

⟨oore⟩ represents /ɔː/ in RP, as in Moore.

⟨ughe⟩ can represent /juː/, as in Hughes.

Three consonant quadrigraphs exist in English that are more commonly sounded as two separate digraphs. However, when used in word-initial position they become one single sound:

⟨chth⟩ at the start of a word represents /θ/, as in chthonian.

⟨phth⟩ at the start of a word represents /θ/, as in phthisis.

⟨shch⟩ at the start of word represents /ʃ/ as in shcherbakovite, a mineral named after Russian geochemist and mineralogist, Dmitri Ivanovich Shcherbakov. It is used as the transcription of the Cyrillic letter Щ and usually read as two separate digraphs, /ʃ.t͡ʃ/ as in pushchairs or /s.t͡ʃ/ as in Pechishche, a place name in Belarus.

In word-final position, the French quadrigraph ⟨cque⟩ is sometimes used for /k/ in some loan words, such as sacque (an old spelling of sack).

== French ==
⟨illi⟩ is pronounced [j] in words such as joaillier and quincaillier (which can also be written as joailler and quincailler since 1990).

Additionally, trigraphs are sometimes followed by silent letters, and these sequences may be considered with quadrigraphs:

⟨cque⟩ is pronounced [k] in words such as grecque and Mecque, where the trigraph ⟨cqu⟩ is followed by the feminine suffix -e.

⟨eaux⟩ represents [o] when the silent plural suffix -x is added to the trigraph ⟨eau⟩; e.g., oiseaux.

== German ==
⟨dsch⟩ represents [d͡ʒ] in loanwords such as Dschungel ("jungle"), Aserbaidschan ("Azerbaijan"), Tadschikistan ("Tajikistan"), Kambodscha ("Cambodia"), and Dschingis Khan ("Genghis Khan").

⟨tsch⟩ represents [t͡ʃ], which is a relatively common phoneme in German, appearing in words like deutsch ("German"), Deutschland ("Germany"), Tschechien ("Czech Republic"), and tschüss ("bye").

⟨zsch⟩ represents [t͡ʃ] in a few German names such as Zschopau and Zschorlau.

== Halkomelem ==
There are several Halkomelem alphabets. The Cowichan alphabet includes the quadrigraph ⟨tthʼ⟩ for the sound /t͜θʼ/. (ʼ is a letter of the alphabet, so tthʼ is made up of four letters.)

== Hmong ==
There are several sequences of four letters in the Romanized Popular Alphabet that transcribe what may be single consonants, depending on the analysis. However, their pronunciations are predictable from their components. All begin with the ⟨n⟩ of prenasalization, and end with the ⟨h⟩ of aspiration. Between these is a digraph, one of ⟨dl⟩ /tˡ/, ⟨pl⟩ /pˡ/, ⟨ts⟩ /ʈ͡ʂ/, or ⟨tx⟩ /t͡s/, which may itself be predictable.

⟨ndlh⟩ represents /ndˡʱ/.

⟨nplh⟩ represents /mbˡʱ/.

⟨ntsh⟩ represents /ɳɖʐʱ/.

⟨ntxh⟩ represents /ndzʱ/.

== Irish ==
Between two broad velarized consonants:

⟨adha⟩ and ⟨agha⟩ represent /əi̯/ .
⟨abha⟩, ⟨obha⟩, ⟨odha⟩ and ⟨ogha⟩ represent /əu̯/ (/oː/ in Donegal).
⟨amha⟩ represents /əu̯/.
⟨omha⟩ represents /oː/.
⟨umha⟩ represents /uː/.

Between two slender (palatalized) consonants:

⟨eidh⟩ and ⟨eigh⟩ represent /əi̯/ (/eː/ in Donegal).

Between a broad and a slender consonant:

⟨aidh⟩, ⟨aigh⟩, ⟨oidh⟩ and ⟨oigh⟩ represent /əi̯/.

Between a slender and a broad consonant:

⟨eabh⟩ represents /əu̯/ (/oː/ in Donegal).
⟨eadh⟩ represents /əi̯/ (/eː/ in Donegal) and when unstressed word finally /ə/ (/uː/ in Mayo and Donegal).
⟨eamh⟩ represents /əu̯/ and when unstressed word finally /uː/ in Mayo and Donegal.

== Juǀʼhoan ==
The apostrophe was used with four trigraphs for click consonants in the 1987 orthography of Juǀʼhoan. The apostrophe is considered a diacritic rather than a letter in Juǀʼhoan.

⟨dcgʼ⟩ for [ᶢǀ^{ʢ}]

⟨dçgʼ⟩ for [ᶢǂ^{ʢ}]

⟨dqgʼ⟩ for [ᶢǃ^{ʢ}]

⟨dxgʼ⟩ for [ᶢǁ^{ʢ}]

== Others ==
⟨eeuw⟩ and ⟨ieuw⟩ are used in Dutch for the sounds [eːu̯] and [iːu̯], as in sneeuw ("snow"), and nieuw ("new"). ⟨Uw⟩ alone stands for [yːu̯], so these sequences are not predictable.

⟨gqxʼ⟩ is used in the practical orthography of the Taa language, where it represents the prevoiced affricate [ɢqχʼ].

⟨ngʼw⟩ is used for [ŋʷ] in Swahili-based alphabets. However, the apostrophe is a diacritic in Swahili, not a letter, so this is not a true quadrigraph.

⟨ngng⟩ is used for [ŋŋ] in most Philippine languages. An example is Tagalog pangngalan ("noun") and Ilocano tungngang ("stupid").

⟨nyng⟩ is used in Yanyuwa to write a pre-velar nasal, [ŋ̟].

⟨s-cc⟩ and ⟨s-gg⟩ are used in Piedmontese to represent /stʃ/ and /zdʒ/, respectively, at the end of a word, to avoid confusion with the digraphs ⟨sc⟩ for /ʃ/ and ⟨sg⟩ for /ʒ/ (even though those are marginal phonemes); word-internally, the trigraphs ⟨s-c⟩ and ⟨s-g⟩ are used.

⟨s-ch⟩ is used in the Puter orthographic variety of the Romansh language (spoken in the Upper Engadin area in Switzerland) for the sequence /ʃtɕ/ (while the similar trigraph ⟨sch⟩ denotes the sounds /ʃ/ and /ʒ/). It is not part of the orthography of Rumantsch Grischun, but is used in place names like S-chanf and in the Puter orthography used locally in schools again since 2011.

⟨sjtj⟩ is used in Danish to pronounce [ɕt͡ɕ] in names such as Khrusjtjov.

⟨thsh⟩ is used in Xhosa to write the sound [tʃʰ]. It is often replaced with the ambiguous trigraph ⟨tsh⟩.

⟨tth’⟩ is used in various Northern Athabaskan languages for [t̪͡θʼ], the dental ejective affricate.
