= Eau (trigraph) =

Trigraph

Eau is a trigraph which occurs in some languages that use the Latin script, such as French and English.

== French ==
In Modern French, ⟨eau⟩ is pronounced /o/ and often appears at the end of a word. Generally, ⟨eau⟩ alternates with ⟨e⟩ in another form of a word, for example, the feminine of chameau (camel) is chamelle. There are three main ways of spelling /o/: ⟨o⟩, ⟨au⟩, and ⟨eau⟩, out of which ⟨eau⟩ is by far the rarest.

In Old French, ⟨eau⟩ represented a triphthong, probably pronounced [e̯aɯ̯] (or [ə̯aɯ̯]). This triphthong originated from the Proto-French diphthong [ɛɯ̯], which had formed from the sequence of ⟨e⟩ and ⟨l⟩, where L had vocalized. In the 12th and 13th centuries, both ⟨iau⟩ and ⟨eau⟩ were used ([i̯aɯ̯] was probably a variant pronunciation), but ⟨eau⟩ soon became the standard spelling. Eau is also a word in French.

== English ==
In English, ⟨eau⟩ only exists in words borrowed from French, and so is pronounced similarly in almost all cases (like in plateau, bureau). Exceptions include beauty and words derived from it, where it is pronounced /juː/, bureaucrat where it is pronounced /ə/, bureaucracy where it is pronounced /ɒ/, and (in some contexts) the proper names Beaulieu and Beauchamp (as /juː/ and /iː/, respectively).
