= Khrushchev (surname) =

Khrushchev is one of numerous transliterations of the Russian male surname Хрущёв. Its feminine counterpart is Khrushcheva (Хрущёва). Notable people with the surname include:

- Leonid Khrushchev (1917–1943), missing aviator and son of Nikita Khrushchev Sr.
- Lyudmila Khrushcheva (born 1955), Russian racewalker
- Nikita Khrushchev (1894–1971), leader of the Soviet Union from 1953 to 1964
- Nina Kukharchuk (1900–1984), wife of Nikita Khrushchev Sr.
- Nina L. Khrushcheva (born 1964), great-granddaughter of Nikita Khrushchev Sr.
- Sergei Khrushchev (1935–2020), engineer and son of Nikita Khrushchev Sr.

== See also ==
- Khrushchev: The Man and His Era, a 2003 biography of Nikita Khrushchev
- Kid Kruschev, a 2017 album by Sleigh Bells
- Smash (wrestler) (born 1959), who also used the stage name Krusher Khruschev
