= Tetragraph =

Sequence of four letters representing a sound or set of sounds

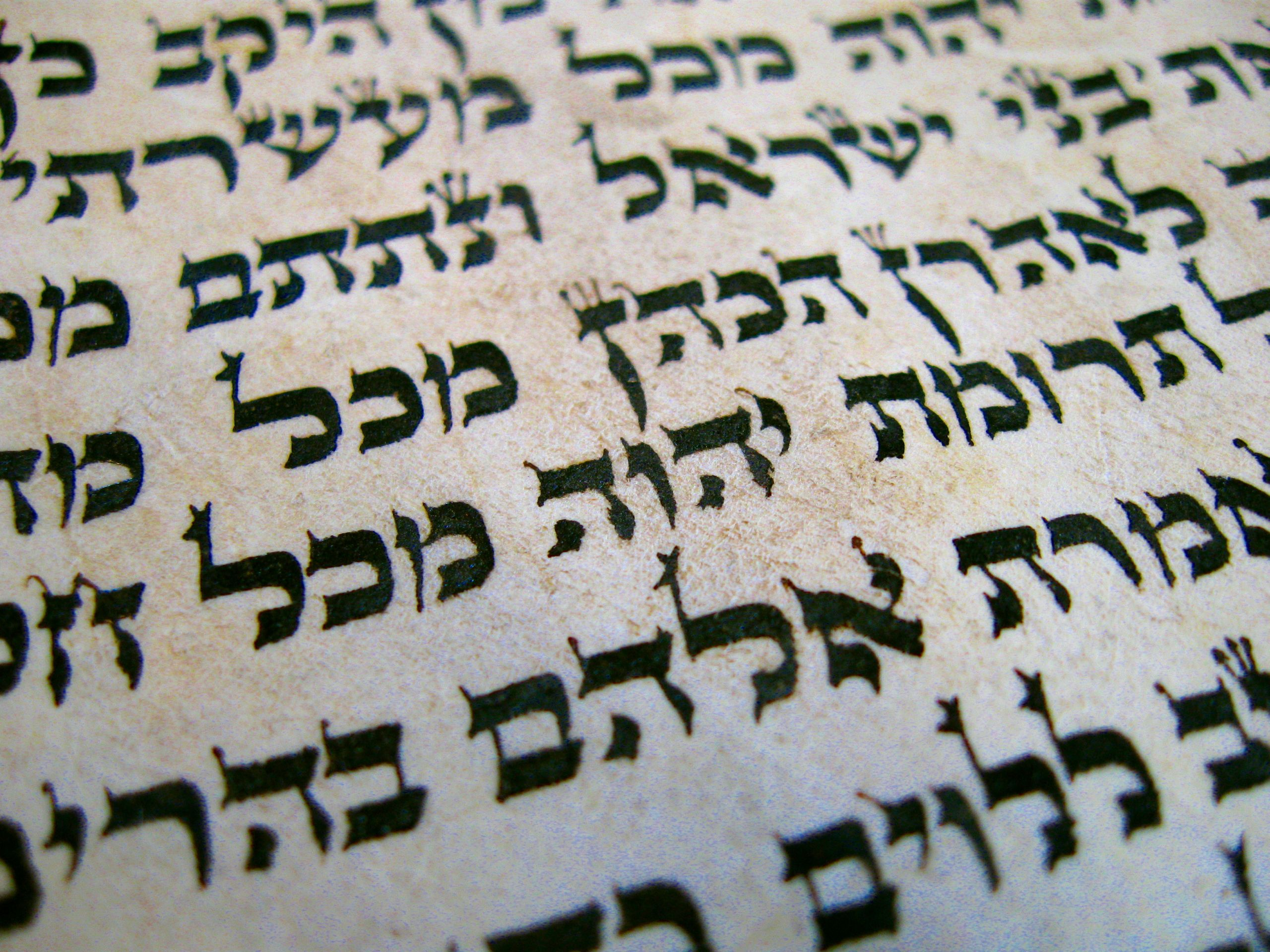
The Tetragrammaton JHWH in a Sefer Torah Numbers 18:27-30

A tetragraph, from Greek τετρα (tetra) 'four', is a sequence of four letters used to represent a single sound (phoneme), or a combination of sounds, that do not necessarily correspond to the individual values of the letters. In German, for example, the tetragraph tsch represents the sound of the English digraph ch. English does not have tetragraphs in native words (the closest is perhaps the sequence -ough in words like through), but chth and phth are true tetragraphs when found initially in words of Greek origin such as chthonic and phthisis.

Phonemes spelled with multiple characters often indicate that either the phoneme or the script is alien to the language. For example, the Cyrillic alphabets adapted to the Caucasian languages, which are phonologically very different from Russian, make extensive use of digraphs, trigraphs, and even a tetragraph in Kabardian ⟨кхъу⟩ for /q͡χʷ/. The Romanized Popular Alphabet created for the Hmong languages includes three tetragraphs: nplh, ntsh, and ntxh, which represent complex consonants.

== List of tetragraphs ==
=== Cyrillic script ===
In Cyrillic used for languages of the Caucasus, there are tetragraphs as doubled digraphs used for 'strong' consonants (typically transcribed in the IPA as geminate), and also labialized homologues of trigraphs.

⟨кхъу⟩ is used in Kabardian for [qχʷ], the labialized homologue of ⟨кхъ⟩ [qχ], in turn unpredictably derived from ⟨къ⟩ [q].

⟨кӀкӀ⟩ is used in Avar for [kʼː], the 'strong' homologue of ⟨кӀ⟩ [kʼ], the ejective (⟨Ӏ⟩) homologue of ⟨к⟩ [k]. It is often substituted with ⟨кӀ⟩ [kʼ].

⟨цӀцӀ⟩ is used in Avar for [tsʼː]. It is often substituted with ⟨цӀ⟩ [tsʼ].

⟨чӀчӀ⟩ is used in Avar for [tʃʼː]. It is often substituted with ⟨чӀ⟩ [tʃʼ].

⟨гъӀв⟩ is used in Archi for [ʁʷˤ]

⟨ккъӀ⟩ is used in Archi for [qːʼˤ]

⟨къIв⟩ is used in Archi for [qʼʷˤ]

⟨ллъв⟩ is used in Archi for [ɬːʷ]

⟨ххьI⟩ is used in Archi for [χːˤ]

⟨хъIв⟩ is used in Archi for [qʷˤ ]

⟨хьIв⟩ is used in Archi for [χʷˤ]

=== Canadian syllabics ===
Inuktitut syllabics has a series of trigraphs for ŋ followed by a vowel. For geminate ŋŋ, these are form tetragraphs with n:

ᙱ ŋŋi, ᙳ ŋŋu, ᙵ ŋŋa

These are literally nnggi, nnggu, nngga.

== See also ==
- Digraph (orthography)
- Trigraph (orthography)
- Pentagraph
- Hexagraph
- Heptagraph
- Multigraph (orthography)
- List of Cyrillic letters
- Unigraph (orthography)
