= List of Latin-script trigraphs =

A number of trigraphs are found in the Latin script.

== A ==
⟨aai⟩ is used for /aːi̯/ in Dutch and various Cantonese romanisations.

⟨abh⟩ is used for /əu̯/ (/oː/ in Ulster) in Irish.

⟨adh⟩ is used for /əi̯/ (/eː/ in Ulster) in Irish, when stressed or for /ə/ (/uː/ in Mayo and Ulster), when unstressed word-finally.

⟨aei⟩ is used for /eː/ in Irish.

⟨agh⟩ is used for /əi̯/ (/eː/ in Ulster) in Irish.

⟨aim⟩ is used for /ɛ̃/ (/ɛm/ before a vowel) in French.

⟨ain⟩ is used for /ɛ̃/ (/ɛn/ before a vowel) in French. It also represents /ɛ̃/ in Tibetan Pinyin, where it is alternatively written ⟨än⟩.

⟨aío⟩ is used for /iː/ in Irish, between broad consonants.

⟨air⟩ is used for /ɛː/ in RP, as in chair.

⟨amh⟩ is used for /əu̯/ in Irish.

⟨aoi⟩ is used for /iː/ in Irish, between a broad and a slender consonant.

⟨aon⟩ is used for /ɑ̃/ (/ɑn/ before a vowel) in French.

⟨aou⟩ is used for /u/ in French.

⟨aoû⟩ is used in a few words in French for /u/.

⟨aqh⟩ is used for the strident vowel /a᷽/ in Taa (If IPA does not display properly, it is an ⟨a⟩ with a double tilde ⟨≈⟩ underneath.)

== B–C ==
⟨bhf⟩ is used for /w/ and /vʲ/ in Irish. It is used for the eclipsis of ⟨f⟩.

⟨cʼh⟩ is used for /x/ (a voiceless velar fricative) in Breton. It should not be confused with ch, which represents /ʃ/ (a voiceless postalveolar fricative).

⟨cci⟩ is used for /tʃː/ before ⟨a⟩, ⟨o⟩, ⟨u⟩ in Italian.

⟨ccs⟩ is used for [tʃː] in Hungarian for geminated ⟨cs⟩. It is collated as ⟨cs⟩ rather than as ⟨c⟩. It is only used within roots; when two ⟨cs⟩ are brought together in a compound word, they form the regular sequence ⟨cscs⟩.

⟨chd⟩ is used for /dʒ/ in Eskayan romanised orthography and /xk/ in Scottish Gaelic.

⟨chh⟩ is used for /tʃʰ/ in Quechua and romanizations of Indic languages. It is also used in Hokkien Pe̍h-ōe-jī for /tsʰ/ and /tɕʰ/ (when preceding i).

⟨chj⟩ is used in for /c/ in Corsican.

⟨chw⟩ is used for /w/ in southern dialects of Welsh

== D ==
⟨dch⟩ is used for the prevoiced aspirated affricate /d͡tʃʰ/ in Juǀʼhoan.

⟨ddh⟩ is used for the dental affricate /tθ/ in Chipewyan.

⟨ddz⟩ is a long Hungarian ⟨dz⟩, [dːz]. It is collated as ⟨dz⟩ rather than as ⟨d⟩. It is not used within roots, where ⟨dz⟩ may be either long or short; but when an assimilated suffix is added to the stem, it may form the trigraph rather than the regular sequence *⟨dzdz⟩. Examples are eddze, lopóddzon.

⟨djx⟩ is used for the prevoiced uvularized affricate /d͡tʃᵡ/ in Juǀʼhoan.

⟨dlh⟩ is used for /tˡʰ/ in the Romanized Popular Alphabet of Hmong.

⟨drz⟩ is used for /dʒ/ in English transcriptions of the Polish digraph ⟨dż⟩.

⟨dsh⟩ is used for the foreign sound /dʒ/ in German. A common variant is the tetragraph ⟨dsch⟩. It is used in Juǀʼhoan for the prevoiced aspirated affricate /d͡tsʰ/.

⟨dsj⟩ is used for foreign loan words with /dʒ/ Norwegian. Sometimes the digraph dj is used.

⟨dtc⟩ is used for the voiced palatal click /ᶢǂ/ in Naro.

⟨dzh⟩ is used for /dʒ/ in English transcriptions of the Russian digraph ⟨дж⟩. In the practical orthography of Taa, where it represents the prevoiced affricate /dtsʰ/.

⟨dzi⟩ is used for /dʑ/ when it precedes a vowel and /dʑi/ otherwise in Polish, and is considered a variant of the digraph dź appearing in other situations.

⟨dzs⟩ is used for the voiced palato-alveolar affricate /dʒ/ in Hungarian

⟨dzv⟩ is used for the whistled sibilant affricate /d͡z̤ᵝ/ in Shona.

⟨dzx⟩ is used for the prevoiced uvularized affricate /d͡tsᵡ/ in Juǀʼhoan.

== E ==
⟨eai⟩ is used for /a/ in Irish, between slender consonants. It is also used in French for /e/ after ⟨g⟩.

⟨eái⟩ is used for /aː/ in Irish, between slender consonants.

⟨eau⟩ is used for /o/ in French and is a word itself meaning "water".

⟨eaw⟩ is used for /ɐʏ/ in Lancashire dialect.

⟨eeu⟩ is used for /iːu/ in Afrikaans.

⟨ein⟩ is used for /ɛ̃/ (/ɛn/ before a vowel) in French.

⟨eoi⟩ is used for /oː/ in Irish, between slender consonants. It is also used in Cantonese Jyutping for /ɵy̯/.

⟨eqh⟩ is used for the strident vowel /e᷽/ in the practical orthography of Taa (If this symbol does not display properly, it is an ⟨e⟩ with a double tilde ⟨≈⟩ underneath).

⟨eui⟩ is used in Cantonese Yale romanisation for /ɵy̯/.

== F ==
⟨fnd⟩ is used for /mt/ in Icelandic.

⟨fnt⟩ is used for /m̥t/ in Icelandic.

== G ==
⟨ggi⟩ is used for /dʒː/ before ⟨a⟩, ⟨o⟩, ⟨u⟩ in Italian.

⟨ggj⟩ is used for /ʝː/ in the Nynorsk Norwegian standard; e.g., leggja "lay".

⟨ggw⟩ is used for ejective /kʷʼ/ in Hadza.

⟨ggy⟩ is used for [ɟː] in Hungarian as a geminated ⟨gy⟩. It is collated as ⟨gy⟩ rather than as ⟨g⟩. It is only used within roots; when two ⟨gy⟩ are brought together in a compound

⟨ghj⟩ is used for /ɟ/ in Corsican.

⟨ghw⟩ is used for a labialized velar/uvular /ʁʷ/ in Chipewyan. In Canadian Tlingit it represents /qʷ/, which is written ⟨gw⟩ in Alaska. It is also used for /ɣʷ/ in Gwich'in.

⟨gli⟩ is used for /ʎː/ before a vowel other than ⟨i⟩ in Italian.

⟨gln⟩ is used for /ŋn/ in Talossan.

⟨gni⟩ is used for /ɲ/ in a few French words such as châtaignier /ʃɑtɛɲe/.

⟨gqh⟩ is used for the prevoiced affricate /ɢqʰ/ in the practical orthography of Taa.

⟨guë⟩ and ⟨güe⟩ are used for /ɡy/ at the ends of words that end in the feminine suffix -e in French. E.g. aiguë "sharp" and ambiguë "ambiguous". In the French spelling reform of 1990, it was recommended that traditional ⟨guë⟩ be changed to ⟨güe⟩.

⟨gǃh⟩ ⟨gǀh⟩ ⟨gǁh⟩ ⟨gǂh⟩ are used in Juǀʼhoan for its four prevoiced aspirated clicks, /ᶢᵏǃʰ, ᶢᵏǀʰ, ᶢᵏǁʰ, ᶢᵏǂʰ/.

⟨gǃk⟩ ⟨gǀk⟩ ⟨gǁk⟩ ⟨gǂk⟩ are used in Juǀʼhoan for its four prevoiced affricate ejective-contour clicks, /ᶢᵏǃ͡χʼ, ᶢᵏǀ͡χʼ, ᶢᵏǁ͡χʼ, ᶢᵏǂ͡χʼ/.

⟨gǃx⟩ ⟨gǀx⟩ ⟨gǁx⟩ ⟨gǂx⟩ are used in Juǀʼhoan for its four prevoiced affricate pulmonic-contour clicks, /ᶢᵏǃ͡χ, ᶢᵏǀ͡χ, ᶢᵏǁ͡χ, ᶢᵏǂ͡χ/.

== H ==
⟨hhw⟩ is used for a labialized velar/uvular /χʷ/ in Chipewyan.

⟨hky⟩ is used for the aspirated voiceless post-alveolar affricate /t͡ʃʰ/ in some romanizations of Burmese ချ or ခြ.

⟨hml⟩ is used for /m̥ˡ/ in the Romanized Popular Alphabet used to write Hmong.

⟨hny⟩ is used for /ɲ̥/ in the Romanized Popular Alphabet used to write Hmong.

== I ==
⟨idh⟩ is used for an unstressed word-final /əj/ in Irish, which is realised as /iː/, /ə/ and /əɟ/ depending on dialect.

⟨ieë⟩ represents /iː/ in Afrikaans.

⟨igh⟩ is used for an unstressed word-final /əj/ in Irish, which is realised as /iː/, /ə/ and /əɟ/ depending on dialect. In English it may be used for /aɪ/, e.g. light /laɪt/.

⟨ign⟩ is used for /ɲ/ in a few French words such as oignon /ɔɲɔ̃/ "onion" and encoignure "corner". It was eliminated in the French spelling reform of 1990, but continues to be used.

⟨ije⟩ is used for /je/ or /jeː/ in the ijekavian reflex of Serbo-Croatian.

⟨ilh⟩ is used for /ʎ/ in Breton.

⟨ill⟩ is used for /j/ in French, as in épouiller /epuje/.

⟨iqh⟩ is used for the strident vowel /i᷽/ in the practical orthography of Taa. (If IPA does not display properly, it is an ⟨i⟩ with a double tilde ⟨≈⟩ underneath.)

⟨iúi⟩ is used for /uː/ in Irish, between slender consonants.

== K–L ==
⟨khu⟩ is used for /kʷʼ/ in Ossete.

⟨khw⟩ is used for /qʷʰ/ in Canadian Tlingit, which is written ⟨kw⟩ in Alaska. It is also used for /xʷ/ in Gwich'in.

⟨kkj⟩ is used for /çː/ in the Nynorsk Norwegian standard, e.g. in ikkje "not".

⟨kng⟩ is used for /ᵏŋ/ in Arrernte.

⟨k'u⟩ is used for /kʷʰ/ in Purépecha.

⟨kw'⟩ is used for /kʷʼ/ in Nuxalk.

⟨kwh⟩ is a common convention for /kʷʰ/.

⟨lhh⟩ is used for /ɬː/ in Nuxalk.

⟨lhw⟩ is used for /l̪ʷ/ in Arrernte.

⟨lli⟩ is used for /j/ after /i/ in a few French words, such as coquillier.

⟨lly⟩ is used for [jː ~ ʎː] in Hungarian as a geminated ⟨ly⟩. It is collated as ⟨ly⟩ rather than as ⟨l⟩. It is only used within roots; when two ⟨ly⟩ are brought together in a compound word, they form the regular sequence ⟨lyly⟩.

⟨lyw⟩ is used for /ʎʷ/ in Arrernte.

== M ==
⟨mbw⟩ is used for /ᵐbʷ/ in Shona.

⟨mpt⟩ is used for the /w̃t/ sound in Portuguese.

== N ==
⟨nch⟩ is used for /ɲɟʱ/ in the Romanized Popular Alphabet used to write Hmong.

⟨ndl⟩ is used for /ndˡ/ in the Romanized Popular Alphabet used to write Hmong. In Xhosa it represents /ndɮ/.

⟨ndz⟩ is used for /ndz/ in Xhosa.

⟨ngʼ⟩ is used for /ŋ/ in Swahili. Technically, it may be considered a digraph rather than a trigraph, as ⟨ʼ⟩ is not a letter of the Swahili alphabet.

⟨ngb⟩ is used for /ⁿɡ͡b/, a prenasalised ⟨gb⟩ /ɡ͡b/, in some African orthographies.

⟨ngc⟩ is used for /ŋǀʱ/ in Xhosa.

⟨ngg⟩ is used for /ŋɡ/ in several languages such as Filipino and Malay that use ⟨ng⟩ for /ŋ/.

⟨ngh⟩ is used for /ŋ/, before ⟨e⟩, ⟨i⟩, and ⟨y⟩, in Vietnamese. In Welsh, it represents a voiceless velar nasal (a ⟨c⟩ under the nasal mutation). In Xhosa, ⟨ngh⟩ represents a murmured velar nasal.

⟨ng'h⟩ is used for voiceless /ŋ̊/ in Gogo.

⟨ngk⟩ is used for a back velar stop, /ⁿɡ̠ ~ ⁿḵ/, in Yanyuwa

⟨ngm⟩ is used for doubly articulated consonant /ŋ͡m/ in Yélî Dnye of Papua New Guinea.

⟨ngq⟩ is used for /ŋǃʱ/ in Xhosa.

⟨ngv⟩ is used for /ŋʷ/ in Bouyei and Standard Zhuang.

⟨ngw⟩ is used /ŋʷ/ or /ŋɡʷ/ in the orthographies of several languages.

⟨ngx⟩ is used for /ŋǁʱ/ in Xhosa.

⟨nhw⟩ is used for /n̪ʷ/ in Arrernte.

⟨nkc⟩ is info for /ŋ.ǀ/ in Xhosa.

⟨nkh⟩ is used in for /ŋɡʱ/ the Romanized Popular Alphabet used to write Hmong.

⟨nkp⟩ is used for /ⁿk͡p/, a prenasalized /k͡p/, in some African orthographies.

⟨nkq⟩ is used for the alveolar click /ŋ.ǃ/ in Xhosa.

⟨nkx⟩ is used for the prenasalized lateral click /ŋ.ǁ/ in Xhosa.

⟨nng⟩ is used in Inuktitut and Greenlandic to write a long (geminate) velar nasal, /ŋː/.

⟨nny⟩ is a long Hungarian ⟨ny⟩, [ɲː]. It is collated as ⟨ny⟩ rather than as ⟨n⟩. It is only used within roots; when two ⟨ny⟩ are brought together in a compound word, they form the regular sequence ⟨nyny⟩.

⟨nph⟩ is used for /mbʱ/ in the Romanized Popular Alphabet used to write Hmong.

⟨npl⟩ is used for /mbˡ/ in the Romanized Popular Alphabet used to write Hmong.

⟨nqh⟩ is used for /ɴɢʱ/ in the Romanized Popular Alphabet used to write Hmong.

⟨nrh⟩ is used for /ɳɖʱ/ in the Romanized Popular Alphabet used to write Hmong.

⟨ntc⟩ is used for the click /ᵑǂ/ in Naro.

⟨nth⟩ is used for /ndʱ/ in the Romanized Popular Alphabet used to write Hmong. In the transcription of Australian Aboriginal languages such as Yanyuwa it represents a dental stop, /n̪t̪ ~ n̪d̪/.

⟨ntj⟩ is used for /nt͡ʃ/ in Cypriot Arabic.

⟨ntl⟩ is used for /ntɬʼ/ in Xhosa.

⟨nts⟩ is used for /ɳɖʐ/ in the Romanized Popular Alphabet used to write Hmong. In Malagasy it represents /ⁿts/.

⟨ntx⟩ is used for /ndz/ in the Romanized Popular Alphabet used to write Hmong.

⟨nyh⟩ is used for /n̤ʲ/ in Xhosa. In Gogo it's voiceless /ɲ̊/.

⟨nyk⟩ is used for a pre-velar stop, /ⁿɡ̟ ~ ⁿk̟/ in Yanyuwa.

⟨nyw⟩ is used for /ɲʷ/ in Arrernte.

⟨nzv⟩ is used for the prenasalized whistled sibilant /ⁿz̤ᵝ/ in Shona.

⟨nǃh⟩ ⟨nǀh⟩ ⟨nǁh⟩ ⟨nǂh⟩ are used in Juǀʼhoan for its four murmured nasal clicks, /ᵑǃʱ, ᵑǀʱ, ᵑǁʱ, ᵑǂʱ/.

== O ==
⟨obh⟩ is used for /əu̯/ (/oː/ in Ulster) in Irish.

⟨odh⟩ is used for /əu̯/ (/oː/ in Ulster) in Irish.

⟨oeë⟩ is used for /uː/ in Afrikaans.

⟨oei⟩ is used for /uiː/ in Dutch and Afrikaans.

⟨oen⟩ is that represents a Walloon nasal vowel.

⟨oeu⟩ is used for /ø/ and /øː/ in the Classical Milanese orthography for the Milanese dialect of Lombard.

⟨ogh⟩ is used for /əu̯/ (/oː/ in Ulster) in Irish.

⟨oin⟩ is used for /wɛ̃/ (/wɛn/ before a vowel) in French. In Tibetan Pinyin, it represents /ø̃/ and is alternately ön.

⟨oío⟩ is used for /iː/ in Irish, between broad consonants.

⟨omh⟩ is used for /oː/ in Irish.

⟨ooi⟩ is used for /oːi̯/ in Dutch and Afrikaans.

⟨oqh⟩ is used for the strident vowel /o᷽/ in the practical orthography of Taa. (If this symbol does not display properly, it is an ⟨o⟩ with a double tilde ⟨≈⟩ underneath.)

== P–R ==
⟨p'h⟩ is used in Kuanua, in p'hoq̄e'ẽ "water".

⟨plh⟩ is used for /pˡʰ/ in the Romanized Popular Alphabet used to write Hmong.

⟨pmw⟩ is used for /ᵖmʷ/ in Arrernte.

⟨pqb⟩ is used for /ᵖqᵇ/ in Soninke.

⟨pss⟩ is used for /psˤ/ in Silesian.

⟨que⟩ is used for final /k/ in some English words of French origin, such as macaque, oblique, opaque, and torque.

⟨quh⟩ is used for /k/ in several English names of Scots origin, such as Sanquhar, Farquhar, and Urquhart or /h/, as in Colquhoun.

⟨qw'⟩ is used for /qʷʼ/ in Nuxalk.

⟨qxʼ⟩ is used for the affricate /qχʼ/ in the practical orthography of Taa.

⟨rlw⟩ is used for /ɭʷ/ in Arrernte.

⟨rnd⟩ is used for a retroflex stop /ɳʈ ~ ɳɖ/ in Yanyuwa.

⟨rng⟩ is used for [ɴŋ], a uvular nasal followed by velar nasal, in Inuktitut.

⟨rnw⟩ is used for /ɳʷ/ in Arrernte.

⟨rrh⟩ is used for /r/ in words of Greek derivation such as diarrhea.

⟨rrw⟩ is used for /rʷ/ in Arrernte.

⟨rsk⟩ is used for the sje sound /ɧ/ in Swedish as in the word marskalk /'maɧalk/ "marshal".

⟨rtn⟩ is used for /^{ʈ}ɳ/ in Arrernte.

⟨rtw⟩ is used for /ʈʷ/ in Arrernte.

== S ==
⟨sch⟩ is used for [ʃ] in German and other languages influenced by it such as Low German and Romansh. It is used for the sje sound /ɧ/ in Swedish at the end of a French loanword; e.g., marsch (fr. marche), or in Greek loanwords, such as schema ("schedule") and ischias. In Walloon, it represents a consonant that is variously /h/, /ʃ/, /ç/, or /sk/, depending on the dialect. In English, ⟨sch⟩ is usually used for /sk/, but the word schedule (from the Late Latin schedula) can be /sk/ or /ʃ/ depending on dialect. In Dutch, it may represent word-final [s], as in the common suffix -isch and in some (sur)names, like Bosch and Den Bosch. In the Rheinische Dokumenta, ⟨sch⟩ is used to denote the sounds [ʃ], [ɕ] and [ʂ], while ⟨sch⟩ with an arc below denotes [ʒ].

⟨sci⟩ is used in Italian for /ʃː/ before ⟨a⟩, ⟨o⟩, ⟨u⟩.

⟨shʼ⟩ is used in Bolivian Quechua for /ʂ/.

⟨shr⟩ is used in Gwich'in for [ʂ].

⟨skj⟩ represents a fricative phoneme /ʃ/ in some Scandinavian languages. In Faroese (e.g. at skjóta "to shoot") and in Norwegian (e.g. kanskje "maybe"), it is a usually the voiceless postalveolar fricative [ʃ]. In Swedish (e.g. skjorta "shirt") it is often realised as the sje sound [ɧ].

⟨ssi⟩ is used for /ʃ/ in English such as in mission. It is used in a few French loanwords in Swedish for the sje sound /ɧ/, e.g. assiett "dessert plate".

⟨ssj⟩ is used for the sje sound /ɧ/ in a few Swedish words between two short vowels, such as hässja "hayrack".

⟨ssz⟩ is a long Hungarian ⟨sz⟩, [sː]. It is collated as ⟨sz⟩ rather than as ⟨s⟩. It is only used within roots; when two ⟨sz⟩ are brought together in a compound word, they form the regular sequence ⟨szsz⟩.

⟨sth⟩ is found in words of Greek origin. In French, it is pronounced /s/ before a consonant, as in isthme and asthme; in American English, it is pronounced /s/ in isthmus and /z/ in asthma.

⟨stj⟩ is used for the sje sound /ɧ/ in 5 native Swedish words, it can also represent the voiceless postalveolar fricative /ʃ/ or the consonant cluster /stʲ/ in Norwegian depending on dialect.

⟨sze⟩ is used for /siː/ in Cantonese romanization.

⟨s-c⟩ and ⟨s-cc⟩ are used for the sequence /stʃ/ in Piedmontese.

⟨s-g⟩ and ⟨s-gg⟩ are used for the sequence /zdʒ/ in Piedmontese.

== T ==
⟨tcg⟩ is used for the click /ǂχ/ in Naro.

⟨tch⟩ is used for the aspirated click /ǂʰ/ in Naro, the aspirated affricate /tʃʰ/ in Sandawe, Hadza and Juǀʼhoan, and the affricate /tʃ/ in French and Portuguese. In modern Walloon it is /tʃ/, which used to be written ch. In Swedish it is used for the affricate /tʃ/ in a small number of English loanwords, such as match and batch. In English it is a variant of the digraph ⟨ch⟩, used in situations similar to those that trigger the digraph ⟨ck⟩ for ⟨k⟩.

⟨tcx⟩ is used for the uvularized affricate /tʃᵡ/ in Juǀʼhoan.

⟨thn⟩ and ⟨tnh⟩ are used for /ᵗ̪n̪/ in Arrernte.

⟨ths⟩ is used for /tsʰ/ in Xhosa. It is often replaced with the ambiguous trigraph ⟨tsh⟩.

⟨thw⟩ is used for /t̪ʷ/ in Arrernte.

⟨tl'⟩ is used for /t͡ɬʰ/ in Nuxalk.

⟨tlh⟩ is used for /tɬʰ/ in languages such as Tswana, and is /tɬ/ in the fictional Klingon language from Star Trek, where it is treated as a single letter.

⟨tll⟩ is used in Catalan for /ʎː/. In Valencian and Balearic it represents /ʎ/.

⟨tnh⟩ and ⟨thn⟩ are used for /ᵗ̪n̪/ in Arrernte.

⟨tnw⟩ is used for /ᵗnʷ/ in Arrernte.

⟨tny⟩ is used for /ᶜɲ/ in Arrernte.

⟨ts'⟩ is used for /t͡sʼ/ in Nuxalk.

⟨tsg⟩ is used for /tsχ/ in Naro.

⟨tsh⟩ is used in various languages, such as Juǀʼhoan, for the aspirated affricate /tsʰ/. In the Romanized Popular Alphabet used to write Hmong, it represents the sound /tʂʰ/. In Xhosa, it may be used to write /tsʰ/, /tʃʼ/, or /tʃʰ/, though it is sometimes limited to /tʃʼ/, with /tsʰ/ and /tʃʰ/ distinguished as ⟨ths⟩ and ⟨thsh⟩.

⟨tsj⟩ is used for /tʃ/ in Dutch and Norwegian.

⟨tsv⟩ is used for the whistled sibilant affricate /t͡sᶲ/ in Shona.

⟨tsx⟩ is used for the uvularized affricate /tsᵡ/ in Juǀʼhoan.

⟨tsy⟩ is used for /tʃ/ or /dʒ/ in Seneca, can also be ⟨j⟩.

⟨tsz⟩ is used for the syllables /t͡si/ and /t͡sʰi/ in Cantonese romanization.

⟨tth⟩ is used for the dental affricate /tθʰ/ in Chipewyan. In Potawatomi it is sometimes for the palatal affricate /tʃ/, though ⟨ch⟩ is also used.

⟨ttl⟩ is used for ejective /tɬʼ/ in Haida (Bringhurst orthography).

⟨tts⟩ is used for ejective /tsʼ/ in Haida (Bringhurst orthography).

⟨tty⟩ is used for [cː] in Hungarian as a geminated ⟨ty⟩. It is collated as ⟨ty⟩ rather than as ⟨t⟩. It is only used within roots; when two ⟨ty⟩ are brought together in a compound word, they form the regular sequence ⟨tyty⟩.

⟨txh⟩ is used for /tsʰ/ in the Romanized Popular Alphabet used to write Hmong.

⟨tyh⟩ is used for /tʲʰ/ in Xhosa.

⟨tyw⟩ is used for /cʷ/ in Arrernte.

⟨tze⟩ is used for /t͡si/ in Cantonese names (such as Cheung Tze-keung) or in Chinese names (such as Yangtze).

== U ==
⟨uío⟩ is used for /iː/ in Irish, between broad consonants.

⟨uqh⟩ is used for the strident vowel /u᷽/ in the practical orthography of Taa. (If this symbol does not display properly, it is an ⟨u⟩ with a double tilde ⟨≈⟩ underneath.)

⟨urr⟩ is used for /χʷ/ in Central Alaskan Yup'ik.

== X–Z ==
⟨xhw⟩ is used for /χʷ/ in Canadian Tlingit, which is written ⟨xw⟩ in Alaska.

⟨zhr⟩ is used in Gwich'in for [ʐ].

⟨zzs⟩ is used for [ʒː] in Hungarian as a geminated ⟨zs⟩. It is collated as ⟨zs⟩ rather than as ⟨z⟩. It is only used within roots; when two ⟨zs⟩ are brought together in a compound word, they form the regular sequence ⟨zszs⟩.

== Other ==
⟨ŋgb⟩ (capital ⟨Ŋgb⟩) is used for [ŋ͡mɡ͡b] in Kabiye, a pre-nasalized ⟨gb⟩.

⟨ǃʼh⟩ ⟨ǀʼh⟩ ⟨ǁʼh⟩ ⟨ǂʼh⟩ are used in Juǀʼhoan for its four aspirated nasal clicks, /ᵑ̊ǃʰ, ᵑ̊ǀʰ, ᵑ̊ǁʰ, ᵑ̊ǂʰ/.

⟨ǃkx⟩ ⟨ǀkh⟩ ⟨ǁkx⟩ ⟨ǂkx⟩ are used in Khoekhoe for its four plain aspirated clicks, /ǃʰ, ǀʰ, ǁʰ, ǂʰ/.
