= Irish orthography =

Spelling and punctuation of the Irish language

Irish orthography is the set of conventions used to write the Irish language. A spelling reform in the mid-20th century led to An Caighdeán Oifigiúil, the modern standard written form used by the Government of Ireland, which regulates both spelling and grammar. The reform removed inter-dialectal silent letters, simplified some letter sequences, and modernised archaic spellings to reflect modern pronunciation, but it also removed letters pronounced in some dialects but not in others.

Irish spelling represents all Irish dialects to a high degree despite their considerable phonological variation, e.g. crann ("tree") is read /kɾˠan̪ˠ/ in Mayo and Ulster, /kɾˠaːn̪ˠ/ in Galway, or /kɾˠəun̪ˠ/ in Munster. Some words may have dialectal pronunciations not reflected by their standard spelling, and they sometimes have distinct dialectal spellings to reflect this.

== Alphabet ==
Gaelic type with Roman type equivalents and the additional lenited letters.

Latin script has been the writing system used to write Irish since the 5th century, when it replaced Ogham, which was used to write Primitive Irish and Old Irish. Prior to the mid-20th century, Gaelic type (cló Gaelach) was the main typeface used to write Irish; now, it is usually replaced by Roman type (cló Rómhánach). The use of Ogham and Gaelic type today is restricted to decorative or self-consciously traditional contexts. The dot above a lenited letter in Gaelic type is usually replaced by a following ⟨h⟩ in Roman type (e.g. ⟨ċ⟩ → ⟨ch⟩).

=== Letters and letter names ===
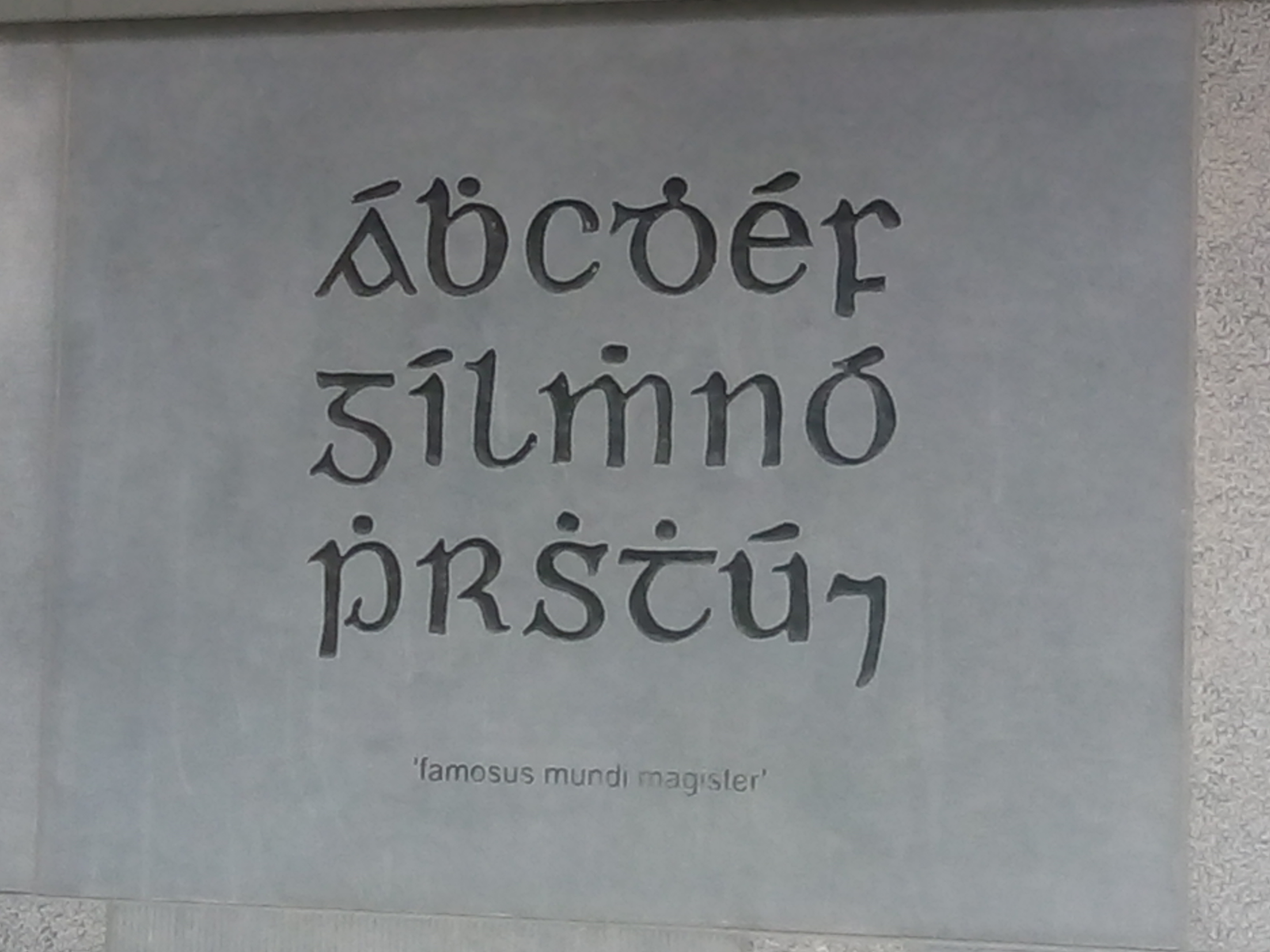
The traditional Irish alphabet carved in Gaelic type on a building in Dublin, with each type of diacritic (síneadh fada and ponc séimhithe) as well as the Tironian et.

The traditional Irish alphabet (aibítir) consists of 18 letters: ⟨a, b, c, d, e, f, g, h, i, l, m, n, o, p, r, s, t, u⟩. It does not contain ⟨j, k, q, v, w, x, y, z⟩, although they are used in scientific terminology and modern loanwords. ⟨v⟩ occurs in a small number of (mainly onomatopoeic) native words (e.g. vácarnach "to quack" and vrác "caw") and colloquialisms (e.g. víog for bíog "chirp" and vís for bís "screw"). ⟨h⟩, when not prefixed to a word initial vowel or after a consonant to show lenition, primarily occurs word initially in loanwords, e.g. hata "hat". ⟨k⟩ is the only letter not listed by Ó Dónaill.

Vowels may be accented with an acute accent (⟨á, é, í, ó, ú⟩; see below). Accented letters are considered variants of their unaccented equivalent, and they follow their unaccented equivalents in dictionaries (i.e. a, á…abhac, ábhacht, abhaile...).

English letter names are generally used in both colloquial and formal speech but there are modern Irish letter names (based on the original Latin names), similar to other languages that use a Latin script alphabet. Tree names were historically used to name the letters. Tradition taught that they all derived from the names of Ogham letters, though it is now known that only some of the earliest were named after trees.

In the table below, only bolded letters are used in Irish words. However, letters in italics are used in nativised loanwords.

Letter	Name	Name (IPA)	Tree Name (Bríatharogam)	Ogham equivalent	Notes
**Aa**	á ^{a}	/aː/	ailm (pine)	ᚐ	
**Bb**	bé	/bʲeː/	beith (birch)	ᚁ	
**Cc**	cé	/ceː/	coll (hazel)	ᚉ	
**Dd**	dé	/dʲeː/	dair (oak)	ᚇ	
**Ee**	é ^{a}	/eː/	eadhadh (poplar)	ᚓ	
**Ff**	eif	/ɛfʲ/	fearn (alder)	ᚃ	
**Gg**	gé	/ɟeː/	gort (ivy)	ᚌ	
**Hh**	héis	/heːʃ/	uath (hawthorn)	ᚆ	
**Ii**	í ^{a}	/iː/	iodhadh (yew)	ᚔ	
Jj	jé	/dʒeː/			Occurs in relatively new loanwords, such as jab, jíp, & júdó. Typically represents [dʒ], a non-native phoneme (see Irish phonology) and is substituted with /ʃ/ in words like Seapáin /ˈʃapˠaːnʲ/.
Kk	cá	/kaː/			Only occurs in a few select unassimilated loanwords and international terms, such as karate, and is replaced by ⟨c⟩ in integrated loanwords due to making the same sound; cearáité. ⟨k⟩ is the only letter not listed by Ó Dónaill.
**Ll**	eil	/ɛlʲ/	luis (rowan)	ᚂ	
**Mm**	eim	/ɛmʲ/	muin (vine)	ᚋ	
**Nn**	ein	/ɛnʲ/	nion (ash)	ᚅ	
**Oo**	ó ^{a}	/oː/	onn (gorse)	ᚑ	
**Pp**	pé	/pʲeː/	ifín (gooseberry or thorn)	ᚘ	See forfeda.
**Pp**	pé	/pʲeː/	peith (dwarf alder)	ᚚ	See forfeda.
Qq	cú	/kuː/		ᚊ	Occurs in unestablished loanwords, such as queer; in most assimilated loanwords, there is often an alternative where ⟨qu⟩ has been replaced with ⟨cu⟩ (cuinín). Typically represents /k/. ⟨Q⟩ is also used to transliterate ceirt.
**Rr**	ear	/aɾˠ/	ruis (elder)	ᚏ	
**Ss**	eas	/asˠ/	sail (willow)	ᚄ	
**Tt**	té	/tʲeː/	tinne (holly)	ᚈ	
**Uu**	ú ^{a}	/uː/	úr (heather)	ᚒ	
**Vv**	vé	/vʲeː/			Occurs in many nativised loanwords, such as veain, véarsa, veidhlín, & vóta. It also rarely occurs in native words, such as onomatopoeia; vácarnach "to quack" and vrác "caw". It also occurs in colloquialisms (e.g. víog for bíog "chirp" and vís for bís "screw"). Usually pronounced /w/ (broad), as in vóta, or /vʲ/ (slender), as in veidhlín; even though the sound /vʲ/ is a native phoneme, the letter ⟨v⟩ itself is a loan consonant, represented in other words by ⟨bh⟩.
Ww	wae	/weː/			Almost never used.
Xx	eacs	/ɛksˠ/			Occurs in relatively new loanwords, such as xéireagrafaíocht and xileafón, but often only at the start of word roots; ⟨x⟩ at the middle and ends of words is replaced with ⟨cs⟩ or ⟨s⟩, like in tacsaí, eisisféar, or facs. Typically represents /ksˠ/ (broad) or /cʃ/ (slender), although it represents /z/ at the start of words.
Yy	yé	/jeː/			Only occurs in some loanwords as Y-chrómasóm, yóyó,, and is nativised to ⟨i⟩ in almost all assimilated loanwords like ióga or iógart. Typically represents /j/ (as a consonant). It can also rarely represent /ɪ/ (short) or /iː/ (long) (as a vowel).
Zz	zae	/zˠeː/		ᚎ	Occurs in relatively new loanwords, such as Zen, zó-eolaíocht, & zú Typically represents /zˠ/ (broad), as in zú, or /ʒ/ (slender), as in Zen. Both of these sounds are non-native phonemes (see Irish phonology) and are substituted with /s/ in words like Saimbia or Siombáib, or /st/ in words like stoidiaca. ⟨Z⟩ is also used to transliterate straif.

== Grapheme to phoneme correspondence ==
In grapheme to phoneme correspondence tables on this page:

- "U" stands for Mayo and Ulster Irish, "C" for southern Connacht Irish, and "M" for Munster Irish.
- Initially and finally mean word initial or final unless stated otherwise.
- /∅/ means silent, i.e. that the letter(s) are not pronounced.
- The IPA transcriptions of examples on this page are in Connacht Irish.

See Irish phonology for an explanation of the symbols used and Irish initial mutations for an explanation of eclipsis and lenition.

=== Consonants ===
Consonants are generally "broad" (velarised) when beside ⟨a, á, o, ó, u, ú⟩ and "slender" (palatalised) when beside ⟨e, é, i, í⟩. Irish orthography does not allow consonant letters or digraphs to be doubled (except in ⟨ll, nn, rr⟩); in compound words which would result in doubled consonants, they are broken up by a hyphen (see below).

Letter(s)				Phoneme(s)			Example(s)
Letter(s)				U	C	M	Example(s)
b	broad			/bˠ/			bain /bˠanʲ/ "take" (imper.), scuab /sˠkuəbˠ/ "broom"
b	slender			/bʲ/			béal /bʲeːlˠ/ "mouth", cnáib /knˠaːbʲ/ "hemp"
bh	broad			/w/			bhain /wanʲ/ "took", ábhar /ˈaːwəɾˠ/ "material", dubhaigh /ˈd̪ˠʊwiː/ "blacken" (imper.), taobh /t̪ˠiːw/ "side", dubh /d̪ˠʊw/ "black"
bh	slender			/vʲ/			bhéal /vʲeːlˠ/ "mouth" (lenited), cuibhreann /ˈkɪvʲɾʲən̪ˠ/ "common table", aibhneacha /ˈavʲnʲəxə/ "rivers", sibh /ʃɪvʲ/ "you" (pl.)
bh	See below for ⟨(e)abh, obh, (i)ubh⟩						
bhf (eclipsis of ⟨f⟩)	broad			/w/			bhfuinneog /ˈwɪn̠ʲoːɡ/ "window" (eclipsed)
bhf (eclipsis of ⟨f⟩)	slender			/vʲ/			bhfíon /vʲiːnˠ/ "wine" (eclipsed)
bp (eclipsis of ⟨p⟩)	broad			/bˠ/			bpoll /bˠoːl̪ˠ/ "hole" (eclipsed)
bp (eclipsis of ⟨p⟩)	slender			/bʲ/			bpríosún /ˈbʲɾʲiːsˠuːnˠ/ "prison" (eclipsed)
c	broad			/k/			cáis /kaːʃ/ "cheese", mac /mˠak/ "son"
c	slender			/c/			ceist /cɛʃtʲ/ "question", mic /mʲɪc/ "sons"
ch	broad			/x/			cháis /xaːʃ/ "cheese" (lenited), taoiseach /ˈt̪ˠiːʃəx/ "chieftain, Prime Minister of Ireland"
ch	slender	before ⟨t⟩		/x/			boichte /bˠɔxtʲə/ "poorer"
ch	slender	usually		/ç/			cheist /çɛʃtʲ/ "question" (lenited), deich /dʲɛç/ "ten", oíche /ˈiːçə/ "night"
d	broad			/d̪ˠ/			dorn /d̪ˠoːɾˠn̪ˠ/ "fist", nead /n̠ʲad̪ˠ/ "nest"
d	slender			/dʲ/			dearg /dʲaɾˠəɡ/ "red", cuid /kɪdʲ/ "part"
dh	broad	initially		/ɣ/			dhorn /ɣoːɾˠn̪ˠ/ "fist" (lenited)
dh	broad	elsewhere		/∅/			ádh /aː/ "luck"
dh	slender	usually		/j/			dhearg /ˈjaɾˠəɡ/ "red" (lenited), fáidh /fˠaːj/ "prophet"
dh	slender	finally		/j/	/∅/	/ɟ/	dhearg /ˈjaɾˠəɡ/ "red" (lenited), fáidh /fˠaːj/ "prophet"
dh	See below for ⟨(e)adh, (a)idh, eidh, odh, oidh⟩. See Exceptions for -⟨dh⟩ at the end of verbs endings.						
dt	broad	eclipsis of ⟨t⟩		/d̪ˠ/			dtaisce /ˈd̪ˠaʃcə/ "treasure" (eclipsed)
dt	broad	elsewhere		/t̪ˠ/			greadta /ˈɟɾʲat̪ˠə/ "beaten"
dt	slender	eclipsis of ⟨t⟩		/dʲ/			dtír /dʲiːɾʲ/ "country" (eclipsed)
dt	slender	elsewhere		/tʲ/			goidte /ˈɡɛtʲə/ "stolen"
f	broad			/fˠ/			fós /fˠoːsˠ/ "still", graf /ɡɾˠafˠ/ "graph"
f	slender			/fʲ/			fíon /fʲiːnˠ/ "wine", stuif /sˠt̪ˠɪfʲ/ "stuff"
f	See Exceptions in verb forms for -⟨f⟩- in future and conditional personal verb endings.						
fh				/∅/			fhuinneog /ˈɪn̠ʲoːɡ/ "window" (lenited), fhíon /iːnˠ/ "wine" (lenited)
g	broad			/ɡ/			gasúr /ˈɡasˠuːɾˠ/ "boy", bog /bˠɔɡ/ "soft"
g	slender			/ɟ/			geata /ˈɟat̪ˠə/ "gate", carraig /ˈkaɾˠəɟ/ "rock"
gc (eclipsis of ⟨c⟩)	broad			/ɡ/			gcáis /ɡaːʃ/ "cheese" (eclipsed)
gc (eclipsis of ⟨c⟩)	slender			/ɟ/			gceist /ɟɛʃtʲ/ "question" (eclipsed)
gh	broad	initially		/ɣ/			ghasúr /ˈɣasˠuːɾˠ/ "boy" (lenited)
gh	broad	elsewhere		/∅/			Eoghan /ˈoːənˠ/ (male name)
gh	slender	usually		/j/			gheata /ˈjat̪ˠə/ "gate" (lenited), dóigh /d̪ˠoːj/ "way, manner"
gh	slender	finally		/j/	/∅/	/ɟ/	gheata /ˈjat̪ˠə/ "gate" (lenited), dóigh /d̪ˠoːj/ "way, manner"
gh	See below for ⟨(e)agh, aigh, eigh, ogh, oigh, (u)igh⟩. See Exceptions for ⟨(a)igh⟩ at the end of verbs.						
h				/h/			hata /ˈhat̪ˠə/ "hat", na héisc /n̪ˠə heːʃc/ "the fish" (plural)
j (loan consonant)				/dʒ/			jab /ˈdʒabˠ/ "job", jíp /dʒiːpʲ/ "jeep"
l	broad	initially	usually	/l̪ˠ/			luí /l̪ˠiː/ "lying (down)"
l	broad	initially	lenited	/lˠ/			lann /lˠaːn̪ˠ/ "blade" (lenited)
l	broad	elsewhere		/lˠ/ or /l̪ˠ/			béal /bʲeːlˠ/ "mouth"
l	slender	initially	usually	/l̠ʲ/			leisciúil /ˈl̠ʲɛʃcuːlʲ/ "lazy"
l	slender	initially	lenited	/lʲ/			leanbh /ˈlʲanˠəw/ "baby" (lenited)
l	slender	elsewhere		/lʲ/ or /l̠ʲ/			siúil /ˈʃuːlʲ/ "walk"
ll	broad			/l̪ˠ/			poll /poːl̪ˠ/ "hole"
ll	slender			/l̠ʲ/			coill /kəil̠ʲ/ "woods"
m	broad			/mˠ/			mór /mˠoːɾˠ/ "big", am /aːmˠ/ "time"
m	slender			/mʲ/			milis /ˈmʲɪlʲəʃ/ "sweet", im /iːmʲ/ "butter"
mb (eclipsis of ⟨b⟩)	broad			/mˠ/			mbaineann /ˈmˠanʲən̪ˠ/ "takes" (eclipsed)
mb (eclipsis of ⟨b⟩)	slender			/mʲ/			mbéal /mʲeːlˠ/ "mouth" (eclipsed)
mh	broad			/w/			mhór /woːɾˠ/ "big" (lenited), lámha /ˈl̪ˠaːwə/ "hands", léamh /l̠ʲeːw/ "reading"
mh	slender			/vʲ/			mhilis /ˈvʲɪlʲəʃ/ "sweet" (lenited), uimhir /ˈɪvʲəɾʲ/ "number", nimh /n̠ʲɪvʲ/ "poison"
mh	See below for ⟨(e)amh, omh, (i)umh⟩.						
n	broad	initially	usually	/n̪ˠ/			naoi /n̪ˠiː/ "nine"
n	broad	initially	lenited	/nˠ/			nótaí /nˠoːt̪ˠiː/ "notes" (lenited)
n	broad	after non ⟨s(h)⟩ initial cons.		/ɾˠ/		/nˠ/	mná /mˠɾˠaː/ "women", cnaipe /ˈkɾˠapʲə/ "press"
n	broad	usually		/nˠ/ or /n̪ˠ/			bean /bʲanˠ/ "woman"
n	slender	initially	usually	/n̠ʲ/			neart /n̠ʲaɾˠt̪ˠ/ "strength"
n	slender	initially	lenited	/nʲ/			neart /nʲaɾˠt̪ˠ/ "strength" (lenited)
n	slender	after non ⟨s(h)⟩ initial cons.		/ɾʲ/		/nʲ/	gnéas /ɟɾʲeːsˠ/ "sex", cníopaire /ˈcɾʲiːpˠəɾʲə/ "skinflint"
n	slender	usually		/nʲ/ or /n̠ʲ/			Eoin /oːnʲ/ (male name)
nc	broad			/ŋk/			ancaire /ˈaŋkəɾʲə/ "anchor"
nc	slender			/ɲc/			rinc /ɾˠɪɲc/ "dance"
nd (eclipsis of ⟨d⟩)	broad			/n̪ˠ/			ndorn /n̪ˠoːɾˠn̪ˠ/ "fist" (eclipsed)
nd (eclipsis of ⟨d⟩)	slender			/n̠ʲ/			ndearg /ˈn̠ʲaɾˠəɡ/ "red" (eclipsed)
ng	broad	eclipsis of ⟨g⟩		/ŋ/			ngasúr /ˈŋasˠuːɾˠ/ "boy" (eclipsed)
ng	broad	elsewhere		/ŋ(g)/			long /l̪ˠuːŋɡ/ "ship", teanga /ˈtʲaŋɡə/ "tongue"
ng	slender	eclipsis of ⟨g⟩		/ɲ/			ngeata /ˈɲat̪ˠə/ "gate" (eclipsed)
ng	slender	elsewhere		/ɲ(ɟ)/			cuing /kɪɲɟ/ "yoke", ingear /ˈɪɲɟəɾˠ/ "vertical"
nn	broad			/n̪ˠ/			ceann /caːn̪ˠ/ "head"
nn	slender			/n̠ʲ/			tinneas /ˈtʲɪn̠ʲəsˠ/ "illness"
p	broad			/pˠ/			poll /pˠoːl̪ˠ/ "hole", stop /sˠt̪ˠɔpˠ/ "stop"
p	slender			/pʲ/			príosún /ˈpʲɾʲiːsˠuːnˠ/ "prison", truip /t̪ˠɾˠɪpʲ/ "trip"
ph	broad			/fˠ/			pholl /fˠoːl̪ˠ/ "hole" (lenited)
ph	slender			/fʲ/			phríosún /ˈfʲɾʲiːsˠuːnˠ/ "prison" (lenited)
r	broad			/ɾˠ/			ruán /ˈɾˠuːaːnˠ/ "buckwheat", cumhra /kuːɾˠə/ "fragrant", fuar /fˠuəɾˠ/ "cold"
r	slender	initially		/ɾˠ/			rí /ɾˠiː/ "king"
r	slender	before /d/, /h/, /l/, /n/, /ɾ/, /s/, /ʃ/, /t/		/ɾˠ/			airde /aːɾˠdʲə/ "height", duirling /ˈd̪ˠuːɾˠl̠ʲən̠ʲ/ "stony beach", coirnéal /ˈkoːɾˠn̠ʲeːlˠ/ "corner", cuairt /kuəɾˠtʲ/ "visit", oirthear /ˈɔɾˠhəɾˠ/ "east"
r	slender	after ⟨s⟩		/ɾˠ/			sreang /sˠɾˠaŋɡ/ "string"
r	slender	usually		/ɾʲ/			tirim /ˈtʲɪɾʲəmʲ/ "dry", fuair /fˠuəɾʲ/ "got"
rr				/ɾˠ/			carr /kaːɾˠ/ "car, cart"
s	broad			/sˠ/			Sasana /ˈsˠasˠənˠə/ "England", tús /t̪ˠuːsˠ/ "beginning"
s	slender	initially before /f/, /m/, /p/, /ɾ/		/sˠ/			sféar /sˠfʲeːɾˠ/ "sphere", speal /sˠpʲalˠ/ "scythe", sméar /sˠmʲeːɾˠ/ "blackberry", sreang /sˠɾˠaŋɡ/ "string"
s	slender	usually		/ʃ/			sean /ʃanˠ/ "old", cáis /kaːʃ/ "cheese"
sh				/h/			Shasana /ˈhasˠənˠə/ "England" (lenited), shiúil /huːlʲ/ "walked"
t	broad			/t̪ˠ/			taisce /ˈt̪ˠaʃcə/ "treasure", ceart /caɾˠt̪ˠ/ "correct"
t	slender			/tʲ/			tír /tʲiːɾʲ/ "country", beirt /bʲɛɾˠtʲ/ "two (people)"
th^{b}	usually			/h/^{c}			thuaidh /huə/ "north", thíos /hiːsˠ/ "below", athair /ˈahəɾʲ/ "father", coinnithe /ˈkɪn̠ʲɪhə/ "kept", ith /ɪh/ "eat", foghlamtha /ˈfˠoːlˠəmˠhə/ "learned", ruaigthe /ˈɾˠuəcə/ "chased", scuabtha /ˈsˠkuəpˠə/ "swept"
th^{b}	finally after a long vowel or diphthong			/∅/			bláth /bˠlˠaː/ "blossom", cliath /clʲiə/ "harrow"
ts (mutation of ⟨s⟩- after an "the")	broad			/t̪ˠ/			an tsolais /ə(n̪ˠ) ˈt̪ˠɔlˠəʃ/ "the light (gen.)"
ts (mutation of ⟨s⟩- after an "the")	slender			/tʲ/			an tSín /ə(nʲ) tʲiːnʲ/ "China"
v (loan consonant)	broad			/w/			vóta /ˈwoːt̪ˠə/ "vote"
v (loan consonant)	slender			/vʲ/			veidhlín /ˈvʲəilʲiːnʲ/ "violin"
x (loan consonant)				/ks/			xileafón /ˈzɪlʲafˠoːn̪ˠ/ "xylophone"
z (loan consonant)	broad			/zˠ/			zú /zˠuː/ "zoo"
z (loan consonant)	slender			/ʒ/			Zen /ʒɛnʲ/ "Zen"

=== Vowels ===
Vowel sequences are common in Irish spelling due to the "caol le caol agus leathan le leathan" ("slender with slender and broad with broad") rule, i.e. that the vowels on either side of any consonant (or consonant cluster) must be both slender (⟨e, é, i, í⟩) or both broad (⟨a, á, o, ó, u, ú⟩), to unambiguously determine if the consonant(s) are broad or slender. An apparent exception is ⟨ae⟩, which is followed by a broad consonant despite the ⟨e⟩.

The pronunciation of vowels in Irish is mostly predictable from the following rules:

- Unstressed short vowels are generally reduced to /ə/.
- ⟨e⟩ before ⟨a⟩ or ⟨o⟩ is silent, but marks a slender consonant. ⟨i⟩ bordering either side of ⟨u⟩ is silent, but marks a slender consonant. This is true for both long and short vowels.
- ⟨io, oi, ui⟩ have multiple pronunciations that depend on adjacent consonants.
- Accented vowels (⟨á, é, í, ó, ú⟩) represent long vowels and in digraphs and trigraphs containing them, surrounding unaccented vowels are silent, but there are several exceptions, e.g. when preceded by two unaccented vowels.
- Accented vowels in succession are both pronounced, e.g. séú /ˈʃeːuː/ "sixth", ríúil /ˈɾˠiːuːlʲ/ "royal, kingly, majestic", báíocht /ˈbˠaːiːxt̪ˠ/ "sympathy", etc.
- ⟨i⟩ and ⟨u⟩ are long before ⟨á, ó⟩, e.g. fiáin /ˈfʲiːaːnʲ/ "wild", ruóg /ˈɾˠuːoːɡ/ "twine"
- A following ⟨rd, rl, rn, rr⟩ lengthens some vowels. ⟨rr⟩ rarely ever occurs after a vowel other than ⟨a⟩.
- A following syllable-final ⟨ll, nn⟩ or word-final ⟨m, ng⟩ may lengthen or diphthongise some vowels depending on dialect.

Letter(s)			Phoneme(s)			Example(s)
Letter(s)			U	C	M	Example(s)
a, ea	stressed	usually	/a/			fan /fˠanˠ/ "stay" (imper.), bean /bʲanˠ/ "woman"
a, ea	stressed	before ⟨rd, rl, rn, rr⟩	/aː/			garda /ˈɡaːɾˠd̪ˠə/ "policeman", tarlú /ˈt̪ˠaːɾˠl̪ˠuː/ "happening", bearna /ˈbʲaːɾˠn̪ˠə/ "gap", fearr /fʲaːɾˠ/ "better"
a, ea	stressed	before syllable-final ⟨ll, nn⟩ and -⟨m⟩	/a/	/aː/	/əu/	mall /mˠaːl̪ˠ/ "slow, late", ann /aːn̪ˠ/ "there", am /aːmˠ/ "time", feanntach /ˈfʲaːn̪ˠt̪ˠəx/ "severe"
a, ea	unstressed	usually	/ə/			ólann /ˈoːlˠən̪ˠ/ "drink" (present), mála /ˈmˠaːlˠə/ "bag", seisean /ˈʃɛʃənˠ/ "he" (emphatic)
a, ea	unstressed	before /x/	/a/	/ə/		Domhnach /ˈd̪ˠoːnˠəx/ "Sunday", taoiseach /ˈt̪ˠiːʃəx/ "chieftain; Irish prime minister"
á, ái			/aː/			bán /bˠaːnˠ/ "white", dáil /d̪ˠaːlʲ/ "assembly", gabháil /ˈɡawaːlʲ/ "taking"
ae, aei			/eː/			Gaelach /ˈɡeːlˠəx/ "Gaelic", Gaeilge /ˈɡeːlʲɟə/ "Irish (language)"
ai, eai	stressed	usually	/a/			baile /ˈbˠalʲə/ "home", veain /vʲanʲ/ "van"
ai, eai	stressed	before ⟨rd, rl, rn, rr⟩	/aː/			airne /aːɾˠn̠ʲə/ "sloe", airde /aːɾˠdʲə/ "height"
ai, eai	stressed	before syllable-final ⟨ll, nn⟩	/a/	/aː/	/əi/	caillte /ˈkaːl̠ʲtʲə/ "lost, ruined", crainn /kɾˠaːn̠ʲ/ "trees"
ai, eai	unstressed		/ə/			eolais /ˈoːlˠəʃ/ "knowledge" (genitive)
aí, aío			/iː/			maígh /mˠiːj/ "claim" (imper.), gutaí /ˈɡʊt̪ˠiː/ "vowels", naíonán /ˈn̪ˠiːnˠaːnˠ/ "infant", beannaíonn /ˈbʲan̪ˠiːnˠ/ "blesses"
ao			/iː/		/eː/	saol /sˠiːlˠ/ "life"
aoi			/iː/			gaois /ɡiːʃ/ "shrewdness", naoi /ˈn̪ˠiː/ "nine"
e, ei	stressed	usually	/ɛ/			te /tʲɛ/ "hot", ceist /cɛʃtʲ/ "question"
e, ei	stressed	before ⟨rd, rl, rn, rr⟩	/eː/			eirleach /ˈeːɾˠl̠ʲəx/ "destruction", ceirnín /ˈceːɾˠnʲiːnʲ/ "record album", ceird /ceːɾˠdʲ/ "trade, craft"
e, ei	stressed	before ⟨m, mh, n⟩	/ɪ/			creimeadh /ˈcɾʲɪmʲə/ "corrosion, erosion", sceimhle /ˈʃcɪvʲlʲə/ "eroded", seinm /ˈʃɪnʲəmʲ/ "playing"
e, ei	stressed	before syllable-final ⟨nn⟩ and -⟨m⟩	/ɪ/	/iː/	/əi/	greim /ɟɾʲiːmʲ/ "grip"
e, ei	unstressed		/ə/			míle /ˈmʲiːlʲə/ "thousand"
é, éa, éi			/eː/			sé /ʃeː/ "he", déanamh /ˈdʲeːnˠəw/ "doing", buidéal /ˈbˠɪdʲeːlˠ/ "bottle", scéimh /ʃceːvʲ/ "beauty", páipéir /ˈpˠaːpʲeːɾʲ/ "papers"
eá, eái			/aː/			Seán /ʃaːnˠ/ "John", caisleán /ˈkaʃl̠ʲaːnˠ/ "castle", meáin /mʲaːnʲ/ "middles", caisleáin /ˈkaʃl̠ʲaːnʲ/ "castles"
eo, eoi		usually	/oː/			ceol /coːlˠ/ "music", dreoilín /ˈdʲɾʲoːlʲiːnʲ/ "wren"
eo, eoi		in four words	/ɔ/			anseo /ənʲˈʃɔ/ "here", deoch /dʲɔx/ "drink", eochair /ˈɔxəɾʲ/ "key", seo /ˈʃɔ/ "this"
i	stressed	usually	/ɪ/			pic /pʲɪc/ "pitch", ifreann /ˈɪfʲɾʲən̪ˠ/ "hell"
i	stressed	before syllable-final ⟨ll, nn⟩ and -⟨m⟩	/ɪ/	/iː/		cill /ciːl̠ʲ/ "church", cinnte /ˈciːn̠ʲtʲə/ "sure", im /iːmʲ/ "butter"
i	unstressed		/ə/			faoistin /ˈfˠiːʃtʲənʲ/ "confession"
í, ío			/iː/			gnímh /ɟnʲiːvʲ/ "act, deed" (gen.), cailín /ˈkalʲiːnʲ/ "girl", síol /ʃiːlˠ/ "seed"
ia, iai			/iə/			Diarmaid /dʲiərmədʲ/ "Dermot", bliain /bʲlʲiənʲ/ "year"
iá, iái			/iː.aː/			bián /ˈbʲiːaːnˠ/ "size", liáin /ˈl̠ʲiːaːnʲ/ "trowel" (gen.)
io		usually	/ɪ/	/ʊ/		siopa /ˈʃʊpˠə/ "shop", liom /lʲʊmˠ/ "with me", tiocfaidh /ˈtʲʊkiː/ "will come", Siobhán /ˈʃʊwaːnˠ/ "Joan", ionga /ˈʊŋɡə/ "(finger)nail"
io		before /d/, /h/, /l/, /n/, /ɾ/, /s/, /ʃ/, /t/	/ɪ/			fios /fʲɪsˠ/ "knowledge", bior /bʲɪɾˠ/ "spit, spike", cion /cɪnˠ/ "affection", giota /ˈɟɪt̪ˠə/ "bit, piece", friotháil /ˈfʲɾʲɪhaːlʲ/ "attention"
io		before syllable-final ⟨nn⟩	/ɪ/	/ʊ/	/uː/	fionn /fʲʊn̪ˠ/ "light-haired"
ió, iói			/iː.oː/			sióg /ˈʃiːoːɡ/ "fairy", pióg /ˈpʲiːoːɡ/ "pie", grióir /ˈɟɾʲiːoːɾʲ/ "weakling"
iu			/ʊ/			fliuch /fʲlʲʊx/ "wet"
iú, iúi			/uː/			siúl /ʃuːlˠ/ "walk", bailiú /ˈbˠalʲuː/ "gathering", ciúin /cuːnʲ/ "quiet", inniúil /ˈɪn̠ʲuːlʲ/ "able, fit"
o	stressed	usually	/ɔ/			post /pˠɔsˠt̪ˠ/ "post"
o	stressed	before ⟨rd, rl, rn, rr⟩	/oː/			bord /bˠoːɾˠd̪ˠ/ "table", orlach /ˈoːɾˠl̪ˠəx/ "inch"
o	stressed	before ⟨n, m⟩	/ɔ/	/ʊ/		conradh /ˈkʊnˠɾˠə/ "agreement", cromóg /ˈkɾˠʊmˠoːɡ/ "hooked nose"
o	stressed	before syllable-final ⟨nn⟩ and -⟨m, ng⟩	/ɔ/	/uː/	/əw/	fonn /fˠuːn̪ˠ/ "desire, inclination", trom /t̪ˠɾˠuːmˠ/ "heavy", long /l̪ˠuːŋɡ/ "ship"
o	unstressed		/ə/			mo /mˠə/ "my", cothrom /ˈkɔ(h)ɾˠəmˠ/ "equal"
ó, ói			/oː/			póg /pˠoːɡ/ "kiss", armónach /ˈaɾˠəmˠoːnəx/ "harmonic", móin /mˠoːnʲ/ "sod, turf", bádóir /ˈbˠaːd̪ˠoːɾʲ/ "boatman"
oi	stressed	usually	/ɛ/			scoil /sˠkɛlʲ/ "school", troid /t̪ˠɾˠɛdʲ/ "fight" (imper.), toitín /ˈt̪ˠɛtʲiːnʲ/ "cigarette", oibre /ˈɛbʲɾʲə/ "work" (gen.), thoir /hɛɾʲ/ "in the east", cloiche /ˈklˠɛçə/ "stone" (gen.)
oi	stressed	before /ɾh/, /ɾʃ/, /ɾtʲ/, /ʃ/, /xtʲ/	/ɔ/			cois /kɔʃ/ "foot" (dat.), cloisfidh /ˈkl̪ˠɔʃiː/ "will hear", boicht /bˠɔxtʲ/ "poor" (gen. sg. masc.), doirse /ˈd̪ɔɾˠʃə/ "doors", goirt /ɡɔɾˠtʲ/ "salty", oirthear /ˈɔɾˠhəɾˠ/ "east"
oi	stressed	before ⟨rd, rl, rn, rr⟩	/oː/			coirnéal /ˈkoːɾˠn̠ʲeːlˠ/ "corner", oird /oːɾˠdʲ/ "sledgehammers"
oi	stressed	next to ⟨m⟩, ⟨n⟩	/ɪ/			anois /əˈnˠɪʃ/ "now", gloine /ˈɡlˠɪnʲə/ "glass", cnoic /knˠɪc/ "hills", roimh /ɾˠɪvʲ/ "before", coimeád /ˈkɪmʲaːd̪ˠ/ "keep" (imper.), loinge /ˈl̪ˠɪɲɟə/ "ship" (gen.)
oi	stressed	before syllable-final ⟨nn⟩ and -⟨m⟩	/ɪ/	/iː/		foinn /fˠiːnʲ/ "wish" (gen.), droim /d̪ˠɾˠiːmʲ/ "back"
oi	stressed	before syllable-final ⟨ll⟩	/ɪ/	/əj/	/iː/	goill /gəil̠ʲ/ "grieve, hurt", coillte /ˈkəil̠ʲtʲə/ "forests"
oi	unstressed		/ə/			éadroime /eːdˠɾˠəmʲə/ "lightness"
oí, oío			/iː/			croíleacán /ˈkɾˠiːlʲəkaːnˠ/ "core", croíonna /ˈkɾˠiːn̪ˠə/ "hearts"
u	stressed	usually	/ʊ/			dubh /d̪ˠʊw/ "black"
u	stressed	before ⟨rd, rl, rn⟩	/uː/			burla /ˈbˠuːɾˠl̪ˠə/ "bundle", murnán /ˈmˠuːɾˠn̪ˠaːnˠ/ "ankle"
u	unstressed		/ə/			agus /ˈaɡəsˠ/ "and"
ú, úi			/uː/			tús /t̪ˠuːsˠ/ "beginning", súil /suːlʲ/ "eye", cosúil /ˈkɔsˠuːlʲ/ "like, resembling"
ua, uai			/uə/			fuar /fˠuəɾˠ/ "cold", fuair /fˠuəɾʲ/ "got"
uá, uái			/uː.aː/			ruán /ˈɾˠuːaːnˠ/ "buckwheat", duán /ˈd̪ˠuːaːnˠ/ "kidney, fishhook", fuáil /ˈfˠuːaːlʲ/ "sewing, stitching"
ui	stressed	usually	/ɪ/			duine /ˈd̪ˠɪnʲə/ "person"
ui	stressed	before ⟨rd, rl, rn, rr⟩	/ɪ/	/uː/		duirling /ˈd̪ˠuːɾˠlʲənʲ/ "stony beach", tuirne /ˈt̪ˠuːɾˠn̠ʲə/ "spinning wheel"
ui	stressed	before syllable-final ⟨ll, nn⟩ and -⟨m⟩	/ɪ/	/iː/		tuillteanach /ˈt̪ˠiːl̠ʲtʲənˠəx/ "deserving", puinn /pˠiːn̠ʲ/ "much", suim /sˠiːmʲ/ "interest"
ui	unstressed		/ə/			aguisín /ˈaɡəʃiːnʲ/ "addition"
uí, uío			/iː/			buígh /bˠiːj/ "turn yellow" (imper.), buíon /bˠiːnˠ/ "band, troop"
uó, uói			/uː.oː/			cruóg /ˈkɾˠuːoːɡ/ "urgent need", luóige /ˈl̪ˠuːoːɟə/ "pollock" (gen.)

==== Short vowels followed by ⟨bh, dh, gh, mh⟩ ====
When followed by ⟨bh, dh, gh, mh⟩, a short vowel usually forms a diphthong or lengthens. In most dialects, this diphthong or lengthened vowel carries over to a neighbouring unstressed vowel.

Letters		Phoneme(s)			Example(s)
Letters		U	C	M	Example(s)
(e)abh(a(i))		/oː(ə)/ or /əu(ə)/	/əu(ə)/		Feabhra /ˈfʲəuɾˠə/ "February", leabhair /l̠ʲəuɾʲ/ "books", sabhall /sˠəul̪ˠ/ "barn"
(e)adh(a(i)), (e)agh(a(i)),	stressed	/eː/ or /əi/	/əi/		meadhg /mʲəiɡ/ "whey", adharc /əiɾˠk/ "horn", adhairt /əiɾˠtʲ/ "pillow", saghsanna /ˈsˠəisˠən̪ˠə/ "sorts, kinds", deagha /d̪ˠəi/ "centaury", aghaidh /əi/ "face"
(e)adh(a(i)), (e)agh(a(i)),	unstressed	/uː/	/ə/		margadh /ˈmˠaɾˠəɡə/ "market", briseadh /ˈbʲɾʲɪʃə/ "breaking"
aidh(e(a)), aigh(e(a))	stressed	/əi/			aidhleann /ˈəilʲən̪ˠ/ "rack", aidhe /əi/ "aye!", aighneas /əinʲəsˠ/ "argument, discussion", aighe /əi/ "cow, ox" (gen.), caighean /kəinˠ/ "cage"
aidh(e(a)), aigh(e(a))	unstressed	/iː/	/ə/	/əɟ/	cleachtaidh /ˈclʲaxt̪ˠiː/ "practice" (gen.), bacaigh /ˈbˠakiː/ "beggar" (gen.)
(e)amh(a(i))	stressed	/əu(ə)/			ramhraigh /ˈɾˠəuɾˠiː/ "fattened", amhantar /ˈəun̪ˠt̪ˠəɾˠ/ "venture", Samhain /sˠəunʲ/ "November"
(e)amh(a(i))	unstressed	/uː/	/ə(w)/	/əw/	acadamh /ˈakəd̪ˠəw/ "academy", creideamh /ˈcɾʲɛdʲəw/ "belief, religion"
eidh(ea/i), eigh(ea/i)		/eː/	/əi/		feidhm /fʲəimʲ/ "function", eidheann /əin̪ˠ/ "ivy", feighlí /ˈfʲəilʲiː/ "overseer", leigheas /l̠ʲəisˠ/ "healing"
(u)idh, (u)igh	stressed	/iː/		/ɪɟ/	ligh /l̠ʲiː/ "sit", guigh /giː/ "pray"
(u)idh, (u)igh	unstressed	/iː/	/ə/	/əɟ/	tuillidh /ˈt̪ˠɪl̠ʲiː/ "addition" (gen.)
obh(a(i)), odh(a(i)), ogh(a(i))		/oː(ə)/	/əu(ə)/		lobhra /ˈl̪ˠəuɾˠə/ "leprosy", bodhar /bˠəuɾˠ/ "deaf", doghra /ˈd̪ˠəuɾˠə/ "misery"
oidh(ea/i), oigh(ea/i)		/əi/			oidhre /əiɾʲə/ "heir", oidheanna /əin̪ˠə/ "tragedies", oigheann /əin̪ˠ/ "oven", loighic /l̪ˠəic/ "logic"
omh(a(i))		/oː(ə)/			Domhnach /ˈd̪ˠoːnˠəx/ "Sunday", comhar /koːɾˠ/ "partnership", domhain /d̪ˠoːnʲ/ "deep"
(i)ubh(a(i))		/uː(ə)/	/ʊ(wə)/	/ʊw(ə)/	dubh /d̪ˠʊw/ "black", tiubh /tʲʊw/ "dense"
(i)umh(a(i))		/uː(ə)/			cumhra /ˈkuːɾˠə/ "fragrant", Mumhan /ˈmˠuːnˠ/ "Munster" (gen.), ciumhais /cuːʃ/ "edge"

== Epenthesis ==
After a short vowel, an unwritten epenthetic /ə/ gets inserted between ⟨l, n, r⟩ + ⟨b, bh, ch, f, g, mh⟩ (as well as ⟨p⟩, when derived from devoiced ⟨b, bh, mh⟩), when within a morpheme boundary, e.g. gorm /ˈɡɔɾˠəmˠ/ "blue", dearg /ˈdʲaɾˠəɡ/ "red", dorcha /ˈd̪ˠɔɾˠəxə/ "dark", ainm /ˈanʲəmʲ/ "name", deilgneach /ˈdʲɛlʲəɟnʲəx/ "prickly, thorny"’ leanbh /ˈl̠ʲanˠəw/ "child", airgead /ˈaɾʲəɟəd̪ˠ/ "silver, money". The main exception to this is ⟨ng⟩ which is mainly used for /ŋ/ or /ɲ/.

Epenthesis does not occur after long vowels and diphthongs, e.g. téarma /tʲeːɾˠmˠə/ "term" or dualgas /ˈd̪ˠuəlˠɡəsˠ/ "duty", or across morpheme boundaries (i.e. after prefixes and in compound words), e.g. garmhac /ˈɡaɾˠwak/ "grandson" (from gar- "close, near" + mac "son"), an-chiúin /ˈan̪ˠçuːnʲ/ "very quiet" (from an- "very" + ciúin "quiet"), carrbhealach /ˈkaːɾˠvʲalˠəx/ "carriageway, roadway" (from carr "car" + bealach "way, road").

In Munster, epenthesis also occurs across morpheme boundaries, when ⟨l, n, r⟩ follow ⟨b, bh, ch, g, mh⟩ (after any vowel) or ⟨th⟩ (after short vowels), and when ⟨n⟩ follows ⟨c, g, m, r⟩.

== Exceptions in verb forms ==
In verb forms some letters and letter combinations are pronounced differently from elsewhere:

Letter(s)				Phoneme(s)			Example(s)
Letter(s)				U	C	M	Example(s)
-dh	broad	preterite		/w/		/ɡ/	moladh é /ˈmˠɔlˠəw eː/ "he was praised"
-dh	broad	elsewhere	before ⟨s⟩- initial pronouns	/tʲ/		/x/	osclaíodh sí /ˈɔsˠklˠiːtʲ ʃiː/ "let her open"
-dh	broad	elsewhere	usually	/w/	/x/		bheannódh mé /ˈvʲan̪ˠoːx mʲeː/ "I would bless"
-dh	slender	before subject pronouns		(silent)			beannóidh /ˈbʲan̪ˠoː/ "will bless"
-ea-	in forms of bí "be"			/ɛ/			bheadh sé /ˈvʲɛtʲ ʃeː/ "he would be"
-eo(i), ó(i)-	verb endings			/axə/	/oː/		bheannóinn /ˈvʲan̪ˠoːn̠ʲ/ "I would bless"
-f-	in personal verb endings			/h/^{c}			dhófadh /ˈɣoːhəx/ "would burn", déarfaidh /ˈdʲeːɾˠhiː/ "will say"
-(a)im				/əmˠ/	/əmʲ/		molaim /ˈmˠɔlˠəmʲ/ "I praise"
-(a)igh	before subject pronouns			/ə/			bheannaigh mé /ˈvʲan̪ˠə mʲeː/ "I blessed"

== Diacritics ==
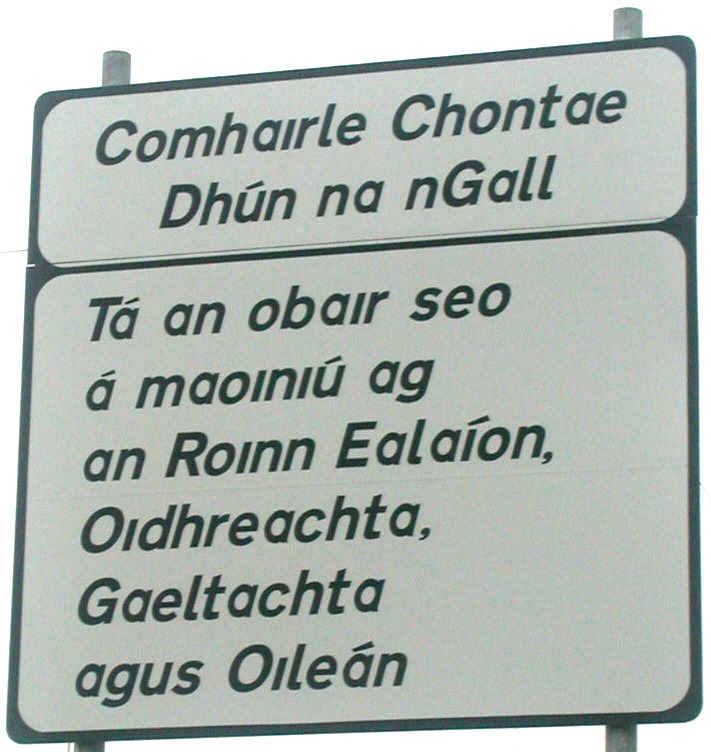
An Irish road sign using the dotless i

An Caighdeán Oifigiúil currently uses one diacritic, the acute accent, though traditionally a second was used, the overdot. If diacritics are unavailable, e.g. on a computer using ASCII, the overdot is replaced by a following ⟨h⟩, e.g. Ḃí sé → Bhí sé "He/It was" and there is no standard for replacing an acute accent, though sometimes it is indicated by a following slash, e.g. fírinne → fi/rinne "truth".

The acute accent (⟨◌́⟩; agúid or (síneadh) fada "long (extension)")^{a} is used to indicate a long vowel, as in bád /bˠaːd̪ˠ/ "boat". However, there are other conventions to indicate a long vowel, such as:

- A following ⟨rd, rl, rn, rr⟩, e.g. ard /aːɾˠd̪ˠ/ "high", eirleach /ˈeːɾˠlʲəx/ "destruction", dorn /d̪ˠoːɾˠn̪ˠ/ "fist", and, in Connacht, a word-final ⟨m⟩, e.g. am /aːmˠ/ "time".
- The digraphs ⟨ae, ao, eo⟩, e.g. aerach /ˈeːɾˠəx/ "gay", maol /mˠiːlˠ/ "bare", ceol /coːlˠ/ "music".
- The tri/tetragraphs ⟨omh(a), umh(a)⟩, e.g. comharsa /ˈkoːɾˠsˠə/ "neighbour", Mumhain /mˠuːnʲ/ "Munster".
- ⟨i⟩ and ⟨u⟩ before ⟨á⟩ or ⟨ó⟩, e.g. fiáin /ˈfʲiːaːnʲ/ "wild", ruóg /ˈɾˠuːoːɡ/ "twine".

The overdot (⟨◌̇⟩; ponc séimhithe "dot of lenition") was traditionally used to indicate lenition, though An Caighdeán exclusively uses a following ⟨h⟩ for this purpose. In Old Irish, the overdot was only used for ⟨ḟ, ṡ⟩, while the following ⟨h⟩ was used for ⟨ch, ph, th⟩ and the lenition of other letters ⟨b, d, g, m⟩ was not indicated, lenition being generally understood due to word position (somewhat like in Danish). Later the two methods were used in parallel to represent lenition of any consonant (except ⟨l, n, r⟩) until the standard practice became to use the overdot in Gaelic type and the following ⟨h⟩ in Roman type. Thus the dotted letters (litreacha buailte "struck letters") ⟨ḃ, ċ, ḋ, ḟ, ġ, ṁ, ṗ, ṡ, ṫ⟩ are equivalent to letters followed by a ⟨h⟩, i.e. ⟨bh, ch, dh, fh, gh, mh, ph, sh, th⟩.

Lowercase ⟨i⟩ has no tittle in Gaelic type. However, as printed and electronic material like books, newspapers and web pages use Roman type almost invariably, the tittle is generally shown. Irish does not graphemically distinguish dotted i and dotless ı, i.e. they are not different letters as they are in, e.g. Turkish and Azeri.

== Punctuation ==
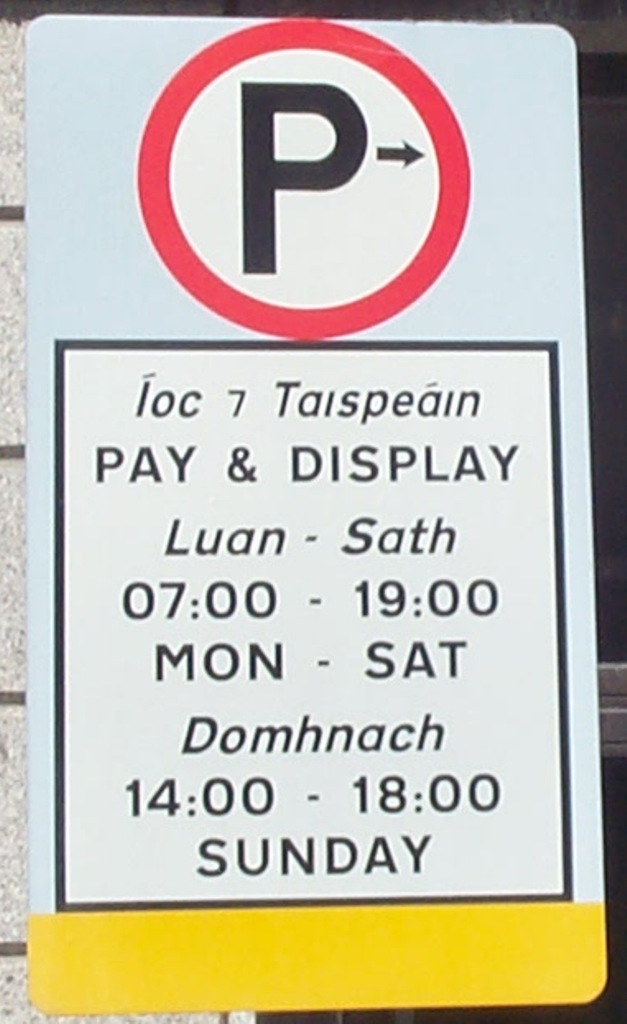
Íoc ⁊ Taispeáin ("Pay & Display") sign in Dublin with the Tironian et for agus "and".

Irish punctuation is similar to English. An apparent exception is the Tironian et (⟨⁊⟩; agus) which abbreviates the word agus "and", like the ampersand (⟨&⟩) abbreviates "and" in English. It is generally substituted by a seven (⟨7⟩) in texts.

A hyphen (fleiscín) is used in Irish after ⟨t, n⟩ when prefixed to a masculine vowel-initial word as an initial mutation, e.g. an t-arán "the bread", a n-iníon "their daughter". However, it is omitted when the vowel is capitalised, e.g. an tAlbanach "the Scotsman", Ár nAthair "Our Father". No hyphen is used when ⟨h⟩ is prefixed to a vowel-initial word, e.g. a hiníon "her daughter".

A hyphen is also used in compound words under certain circumstances:

- between two vowels, e.g. mí-ádh "misfortune"
- between two similar consonants, e.g. droch-chaint "bad language", grod-díol "prompt payment"
- in a three-part compound, e.g. buan-chomhchoiste "permanent joint committee"
- after the prefixes do-, fo-, so- before a word beginning with ⟨bha, bhla, bhra, dha, gha, ghla, ghra, mha⟩, e.g. do-bhlasta "bad tasting", fo-ghlac "subsume", so-mharfacht "mortality"
- in capitalised titles, e.g. An Príomh-Bhreitheamh "the Chief Justice"
- after an- "very" and dea- "good", e.g. an-mhór "very big", dea-mhéin "goodwill"

An apostrophe (uaschamóg) is used to indicate an omitted vowel in the following cases:

- the prepositions de "from" and do "to" both become d' before a vowel or ⟨fh⟩ + vowel, as in Thit sí d'each "She fell from a horse" and Tabhair d'fhear an tí é "Give it to the landlord"
- the possessive pronouns mo "my" and do "your (singular)" become m' and d' before a vowel or ⟨fh⟩ + vowel, as in m'óige "my youth", d'fhiacail "your tooth"
- the preverbal particle do becomes d' before a vowel or ⟨fh⟩ + vowel, as in d'ardaigh mé "I raised", d'fhanfadh sé "he would wait"
- the copular particle ba becomes b' before a vowel or ⟨fh⟩ + vowel, as in B'ait liom é sin "I found that odd" and b'fhéidir "maybe". However, ba is used before the pronouns é, í, iad, as in Ba iad na ginearáil a choinnigh an chumhacht "It was the generals who kept the power"

== Capitalisation ==
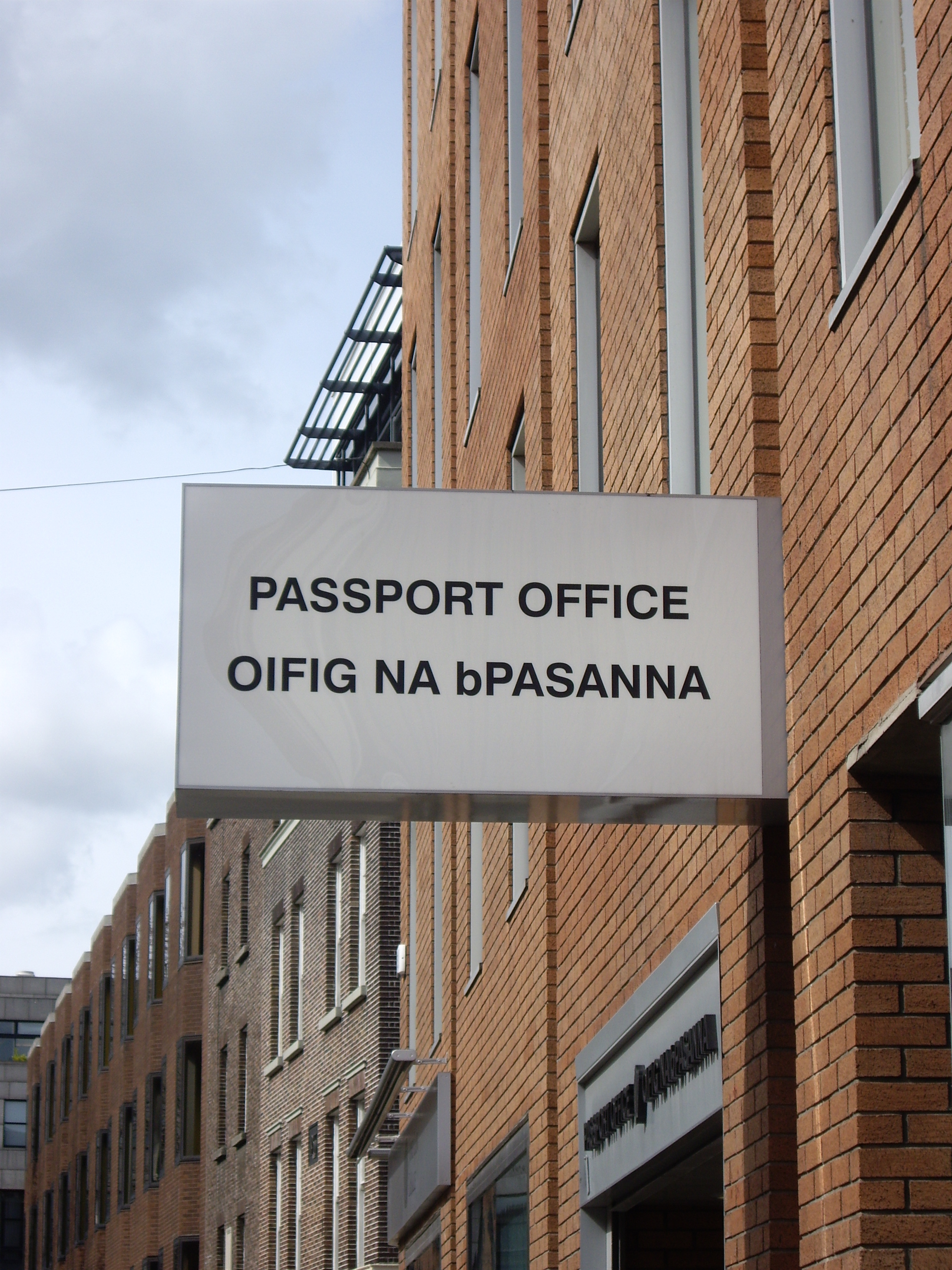
Bilingual sign in Ireland. The eclipsis of ⟨P⟩ to ⟨bP⟩ uses lowercase in an otherwise all-caps text.

Capitalisation rules are similar to English. However, a prefixed letter remains in lowercase when the base initial is capitalised (an tSín "China"). For text written in all caps, the prefixed letter is kept in lowercase, or small caps (STAIR NA HÉIREANN "THE HISTORY OF IRELAND"). An initial capital is used for:

- Start of sentences
- Names of people, places (except the words an, na, de), languages, and adjectives of people and places (Micheál Ó Murchú "Michael Murphy"; Máire Mhac an tSaoi "Mary McEntee"; de Búrca "Burke"; Sliabh na mBan "Slievenamon"; Fraincis "French"; bia Iodálach "Italian food")
- Names of months, weeks and feast-days (Meán Fómhair "September"; an Luan "Monday"; Oíche Nollag "Christmas Eve")
- Dé "day" (Dé Luain "on Monday")
- Definite titles

== Abbreviations ==
Most Irish abbreviations are straightforward, e.g. leathanach → lch. ("page → p.") and mar shampla → m.sh. ("exempli gratia (for example) → e.g."), but two that require explanation are: is é sin → .i. ("that is → i.e.") and agus araile → ⁊rl./srl. ("et cetera (and so forth) → &c./etc."). Like ⟨th⟩ in English, ⟨ú⟩ follows an ordinal numeral, e.g. Is é Lá Fheile Phádraig an 17ú lá den Márta "St. Patrick's day is the 17th [day] of March".

== Spelling reform ==
The literary Classical Irish which survived till the 17th century was archaic; the first attempt at simplification was not until 1639. The spelling represented a dialect continuum including distinctions lost in all surviving dialects by the Gaelic revival of the late 19th century.

The idea of a spelling reform, linked to the use of Roman or Gaelic type, was controversial in the early decades of the 20th century. The Irish Texts Society's 1904 Irish-English dictionary by Patrick S. Dinneen used traditional spellings. After the creation of the Irish Free State in 1922, all Acts of the Oireachtas were translated into Irish, initially using Dinneen's spellings, with a list of simplifications accumulating over the years. When Éamon de Valera became President of the Executive Council after the 1932 election, policy reverted to older spellings, which were used in the enrolled text of the 1937 Constitution. In 1941, de Valera decided to publish a "popular edition" of the Constitution with simplified spelling and established a committee of experts, which failed to agree on recommendations. Instead, the Oireachtas' own translation service prepared a booklet, Litriú na Gaeilge: Lámhleabhar an Chaighdeáin Oifigiúil, published in 1945.

Some pre-reform spellings criticised by T. F. O'Rahilly and their modern forms include: beirbhiughadh → beiriú, imthighthe → imithe, faghbháil → fáil, urradhas → urrús, filidheacht → filíocht.

The booklet was expanded in 1947, and republished as An Caighdeán Oifigiúil "The Official Standard" in 1958, combined with the standard grammar of 1953. It attracted initial criticism as unhistorical and artificial; some spellings fail to represent the pronunciation of some dialects, while others preserve letters unpronounced in any dialect. Its status was reinforced by use in the civil service and as a guide for Tomás de Bhaldraithe's 1959 English–Irish dictionary and Niall Ó Dónaill's 1977 Irish–English dictionary. A review of the written standard, including spelling, was announced in 2010, aiming to improve "simplicity, internal consistency, and logic". The result was the 2017 update of An Caighdeán Oifigiúil.

== See also ==
- Irish Braille
- Irish initial mutations
- Irish manual alphabet
- Scottish Gaelic orthography

== Notes ==
- ^a Vowels with an acute accent are read as [á/é/í/ó/ú] fada "long [á/é/í/ó/ú]".
- ^b In the verbal adjective suffix, -⟨th⟩- becomes ⟨t⟩ after ⟨d, gh, l, n, s, t, th⟩ (⟨gh, th⟩ are deleted before it is added) and it becomes ⟨f⟩ after ⟨bh, mh⟩ which are deleted before it is added.
- ^c After consonants, /h/ is silent, but devoices preceding voiced consonants. See Irish phonology.
