= Trigraph (orthography) =

Group of three letters that represent a single sound

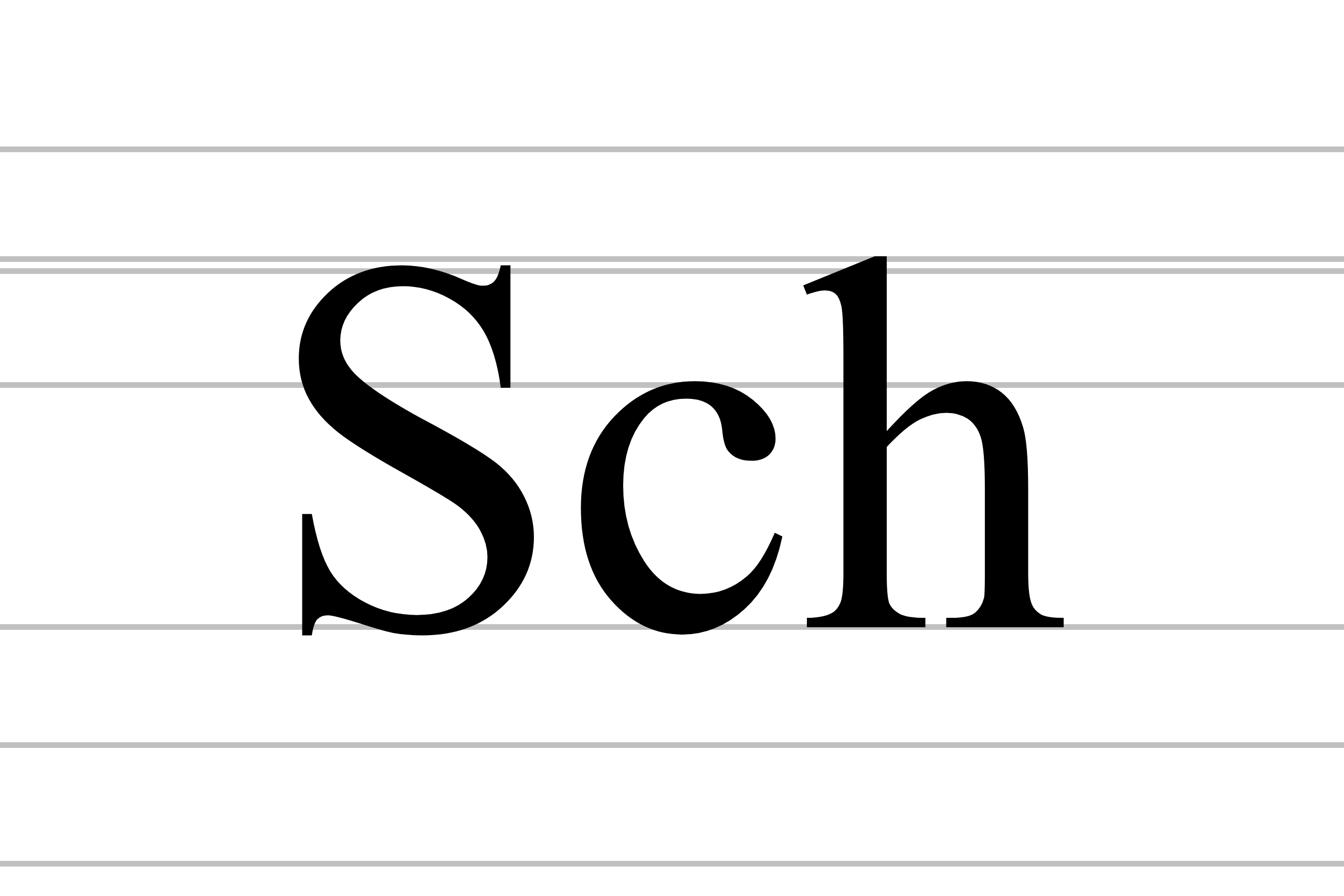
Latin trigraph S C H (Sch)

A trigraph (from Ancient Greek τρεῖς (treîs) 'three' and γράφω (gráphō) 'to write') is a group of three characters used to represent a single sound or a combination of sounds that does not correspond to the written letters combined.

== Latin-script trigraphs ==
For example, in the word schilling, the trigraph sch represents the voiceless postalveolar fricative /ʃ/, rather than the consonant cluster /sx/. In the word beautiful, the sequence eau is pronounced /juː/, and in the French word château it is pronounced /o/. It is sometimes difficult to determine whether a sequence of letters in English is a trigraph, because of the complicating role of silent letters. There are however a few productive trigraphs in English such as tch as in watch, and igh as in high.

The trigraph sch in German is equivalent to the English sh and pronounced /ʃ/. In Dutch, which is closely related to German, this same trigraph is pronounced /sx/. In Italian, however, sch represents the sounds /sk/ before e or i, as in bruschetta /bruˈskɛtta/. In Portuguese, The trigraph sch is equivalent to Russian letter "щ" and pronunced /stʃ/. In none of these languages is this trigraph regarded as an independent letter of the alphabet. In Hungarian, the trigraph dzs is treated as a distinct letter, with its own place in the alphabet, and it is pronounced like the English j /dʒ/. The combination gli in Italian can also be a trigraph, representing the palatal lateral approximant /ʎ/ before vowels other than i, as in aglio, pronounced [ˈaʎʎo].

== Trigraphs in non-Latin scripts ==
Although trigraphs are not uncommon in Latin-script alphabets, they are rare elsewhere. There are several in Cyrillic alphabets, which for example uses five trigraphs and a tetragraph in the Kabardian alphabet: гъу /ʁʷ/, кӏу /kʷʼ/, къу /qʷʼ/, кхъ /q/, and хъу /χʷ/, and also a tetragraph кхъу /qʷ/. While most of these can be thought of as consonant + /w/, the letters in кхъ /q/ cannot be so separated: the х has the negative meaning that кхъ is not ejective, as къ is /qʼ/. (See List of Cyrillic digraphs.)

Tsakonian has τσχ /tʃ/.

The orthography used for the Yiddish language by YIVO uses the Hebrew script trigraph דזש (dalet, zayin, shin) to refer to /dʒ/.

Hangul has a few vowel trigraphs, ㅙ /wɛ/ and ㅞ /we/ (from oai and uei), which are not entirely predictable. However, as ㅐ/ɛ/ and ㅔ/e/ are considered as single letters in modern Korean, ㅙ and ㅞ are considered as digraphs now. There is also a single obsolete consonant trigraph, ㅹ[β], a theoretical form not actually found in any texts. It is composed of digraph ㅃ[b] and a circle-shaped single letter ㅇ, which means the letter "to lighten" sounds, linguistically to change stop consonants to the fricative consonants in cases of bilabial consonants (for ᄛ, ㅇ changes alveolar tap to alveolar lateral approximant or retroflex lateral approximant). Because these letters are created to transcribe consonants of Mandarin (late imperial lingua franca), these are disappeared soon. In modern days, ㅃ is used for different sound, [pʰ].

Japanese kana use trigraphs for (C)yō sequences, as in きょう kyou /kjoo/ ("today"); the う is only pronounced /o/ after another /o/.

In Inuktitut syllabics, the digraph ᖕ ng cannot be followed by a vowel. For that, it must form a trigraph with g:

ᙰ ŋai, ᖏ ŋi, ᖑ ŋu, ᖓ ŋa.

It also forms a trigraph with n for ŋŋ: ᖖ.

== Discontinuous (split) trigraphs ==
The sequence of letters making up a phoneme are not always adjacent. This is the case with English silent e, which has been claimed to modify preceding digraphs as well as preceding single vowel letters. For example, the sequence ou...e has the sound /uː/ in English joule. There are twenty-eight combinations in English, ⟨ai—e⟩, ⟨al—e⟩, ⟨ar—e⟩, ⟨au—e⟩, ⟨aw—e⟩, ⟨ay—e⟩, ⟨ea—e⟩, ⟨ee—e⟩, ⟨ei—e⟩, ⟨er—e⟩, ⟨eu—e⟩, ⟨ey—e⟩, ⟨ia—e⟩, ⟨ie—e⟩, ⟨ir—e⟩, ⟨is—e⟩, ⟨oi—e⟩, ⟨oo—e⟩, ⟨or—e⟩, ⟨ou—e⟩, ⟨ow—e⟩, ⟨oy—e⟩, ⟨ui—e⟩, ⟨ur—e⟩, ⟨uy—e⟩, ⟨ye—e⟩, ⟨yr—e⟩, though it has been argued that a trigraph analysis is unnecessary.

The Indic alphabets are distinctive for their discontinuous vowels, such as Thai แ...ะ /ɛ/, เ...าะ /ɔ/, เ...อะ /ɤʔ/. Technically, however, these may be considered diacritics, not full letters; whether they are trigraphs is thus a matter of definition, though they can in turn take modifying vowel diacritics, as in เ◌ียะ /iaʔ/ and เ◌ือะ /ɯaʔ/.

== See also ==
- Digraph
- Tetragraph
- Pentagraph
- Hexagraph
- Multigraph
- List of Cyrillic digraphs and trigraphs
- List of Latin digraphs
- List of Latin letters
- Trigraph (programming)
- Typographic ligature
