= List of Latin-script digraphs =

This is a list of digraphs used in various Latin alphabets. Letters with diacritics are arranged in alphabetical order according to their base, e.g. ⟨å⟩ is alphabetised with ⟨a⟩, not at the end of the alphabet, as it would be in Danish, Norwegian and Swedish. Substantially-modified letters, such as ⟨ſ⟩ (a variant of ⟨s⟩) and ⟨ɔ⟩ (based on ⟨o⟩), are placed at the end.

Capitalisation only involves the first letter unless otherwise stated. For instance, ⟨ch⟩ becomes ⟨Ch⟩. Exceptions: In Dutch, ⟨ij⟩ becomes ⟨IJ⟩, and in Irish, digraphs marking eclipsis are capitalised on the second letter, i.e. ⟨mb⟩ becomes ⟨mB⟩.

== Apostrophe ==
⟨ʼb⟩ (capital ⟨ʼB⟩) is used in Bari for /ɓ/.

⟨ʼd⟩ (capital ⟨ʼD⟩) is used in Bari for /ɗ/.

⟨ʼm⟩ is used in the Wu MiniDict Romanisation for dark or yin tone /m/. It is also often represented by /ʔm/.

⟨ʼn⟩ is used in the Wu MiniDict Romanisation for dark /n/.

⟨ʼng⟩ is used in the Wu MiniDict Romanisation for dark /ŋ/.

⟨ʼny⟩ is used in the Wu MiniDict Romanisation for dark /ȵ/.

⟨ʼy⟩ (capital ⟨ʼY⟩) is used in Bari and Hausa (in Nigeria) for /ˀj/, but in Niger, Hausa ⟨ʼy⟩ is replaced with ⟨ƴ ⟩.

== A ==
⟨aʼ⟩ is used in Taa for the glottalized or creaky-voiced vowel /a̰/.

⟨aa⟩ is used in Dutch, Finnish and other languages with phonemic long vowels for /aː/. It was formerly used in Danish and Norwegian (and still is in some proper names) for [ɔ] or [ʌ] (in Danish), until it was replaced with ⟨å⟩. There is a ligature ⟨Ꜳ⟩. In Cantonese romanisations such as Jyutping or Yale, it is used for /aː/, contrasting with ⟨a⟩ /ɐ/.

⟨ae⟩ is used in English for Latin loanwords with ⟨ae⟩ are generally pronounced with /iː/ (e.g. Caesar), prompting Noah Webster to shorten this to ⟨e⟩ in his 1806 spelling reform for American English.

In Irish, ⟨ae⟩ represents /eː/ between two "broad" (velarized) consonants, e.g. Gael /ɡeːlˠ/ "a Gael". In Latin, ⟨ae⟩ originally represented the diphthong /ae/, before it was monophthongized in the Vulgar Latin period to /ɛ/; in medieval manuscripts, the digraph was frequently replaced by the ligature ⟨æ⟩.
In German, ⟨ae⟩ is a variant of ⟨ä⟩ found in some proper names or in contexts where ⟨ä⟩ is unavailable.
In Dutch, ⟨ae⟩ is an old spelling variant of ⟨aa⟩ but now only occurs in names of people or (less often) places and in a few loanwords from Greek and Latin.
In Zhuang, ⟨ae⟩ represents /a/ (⟨a⟩ represents /aː/).
In Revised Romanization of Korean, ⟨ae⟩ represents /ɛ/.

⟨ãe⟩ is used in Portuguese for stressed /ɐ̃ĩ̯/ when in the final syllable, e.g. mãe /mɐ̃ĩ̯/ and capitães /ka.pi.ˈtɐ̃ĩ̯s/.

⟨ah⟩ is used in Taa for breathy or murmured /a̤/. In German and English it typically represents a long vowel /ɑː/.

⟨ai⟩ is used in many languages, typically representing the diphthong /aɪ/. In English, due to the Great Vowel Shift, it represents /eɪ/ as in pain and rain, while in unstressed syllables it may represent /ə/, e.g. bargain and certain(ly).

In French, it represents /ɛ/. In Irish, it represents /a/ between a broad and a slender consonant.
In Scottish Gaelic, it represents /a/ or /ɛ/ between a broad and a slender consonant, except when preceding word-final or pre-consonant ⟨ll, m, nn⟩ (e.g. cainnt /kʰaiɲtʲ/, or pre-consonant ⟨bh, mh⟩ (e.g. aimhreit /ˈaivɾʲɪtʲ/.
In the Kernowek Standard orthography of Cornish, it represents /eː/, mostly in loanwords from English such as paint.

⟨aí⟩ is used in Irish for /iː/ between a broad and a slender consonant.

⟨aî⟩ is used in French for /ɛː/, as in aînesse /ɛːnɛs/ or maître /mɛːtʁ/.

⟨ái⟩ is used in Irish for /aː/ between a broad and a slender consonant.

⟨ài⟩ is used in Scottish Gaelic for /aː/ or sometimes /ɛː/, between a broad and a slender consonant.

⟨ãi⟩ is used in modern Portuguese for stressed /ɐ̃ĩ̯/ before consonants, although it is very rare since this diphthong is usually found stressed only at the end of words and therefore spelt as ⟨ãe⟩. Alas, it is currently found in some words such as cãibra /ˈkɐ̃ĩ̯.bɾɐ/. In 1931, in European Portuguese's orthography, it replaced ⟨ãe⟩ in all its occurrences due to a small orthographic reform, but this change was soon reverted in 1945 as part of an orthographic agreement with Brazil to match Brazilian Portuguese's orthography, which still kept ⟨ãe⟩.

⟨am⟩ is used in Portuguese for /ɐ̃ũ̯/ in past verb conjugations word finally, /ɐ̃/ before a consonant, and /am/ before a vowel. In French, it represents /ɑ̃/ in lieu of ⟨an⟩ before ⟨b, m, p⟩.

⟨âm⟩ is used in Portuguese for a stressed /ɐ̃/ before a consonant.

⟨an⟩ is used in many languages to write a nasal vowel. In Portuguese it is used for /ɐ̃/ before a consonant. In French it represents /ɑ̃/ (/an/ before a vowel). In Breton it represents /ɑ̃n/.

⟨aⁿ⟩ is used in Hokkien Pe̍h-ōe-jī for /ã/.

⟨ân⟩ is used in Portuguese for a stressed /ɐ̃/ before a consonant.

⟨än⟩ is used in Tibetan Pinyin for /ɛ̃/. It is alternately written ⟨ain⟩.

⟨ån⟩ is used in Walloon, for the nasal vowel /ɔ̃/.

⟨aŋ⟩ is used in Lakhota for the nasal vowel /ã/

⟨ao⟩ is used in many languages, such as Piedmontese and Mandarin (Hanyu Pinyin), to represent /au̯/.

In Irish, it represents /iː/ (/eː/ in Munster) between broad consonants.
In Scottish Gaelic, it represents /ɯː/ between broad consonants. In French, it is found in a few words such as paon representing /ɑ̃/ and as paonne representing /a/.
In Malagasy, it represents /o/.
In Wymysorys, it represents /œʏ̯/.

⟨ão⟩ is used in Portuguese for /ɐ̃ũ̯/, but only when it appears stressed, since unstressed /ɐ̃ũ̯/ is spelt ⟨am⟩ word finally, this distinction usually happens in verb conjugations. E.g. eles fizeram /ˈe.lis fiˈzɛ.ɾɐ̃ũ̯/ "they made", and eles farão /ˈe.lis fa.ˈɾɐ̃ũ̯/ "they will make".

⟨aq⟩ is used in Taa, for the pharyngealized vowel /aˤ/.

⟨au⟩ is used in English for /ɔː/. It occasionally represents /aʊ/, as in flautist. Other pronunciations are /æ/ or /ɑː/ (depending on dialect) in aunt and laugh, /eɪ/ in gauge, /oʊ/ in gauche and chauffeur, and /ə/ as in meerschaum and restaurant.

In German and Dutch, it represents /au/ and /ʌu/, respectively (/au/ in some northern and /ɔu/ in some southern Dutch and some Flemish dialects).
In French, it represents /o/ or sometimes /ɔ/.
In Icelandic and Norwegian it represents /œy/ and /æʉ/, respectively.
In several Romanizations of Wu Chinese, it represents /ɔ/.
In the Cornish Kernowek Standard, it is used for /ɔ(ː)/, as in caul "cabbage" or dauncya "to dance".

⟨äu⟩ is used in German for the diphthong /ɔɪ/ in declension of native words with ⟨au⟩; elsewhere, /ɔɪ/ is written as ⟨eu⟩. In words, mostly of Latin origin, where ⟨ä⟩ and ⟨u⟩ are separated by a syllable boundary, it represents /ɛ.ʊ/, e.g. Matthäus (a German form for Matthew).

⟨aw⟩ is used in English in ways that parallel English ⟨au⟩, though it appears more often at the end of a word.

In Cornish, it represents /aʊ/ or /æʊ/.
In Welsh, it represents /au/.

⟨ay⟩ is used in English in ways that parallel ⟨ai⟩, though it appears more often at the end of a word.

In French, it represents /ɛj/ before a vowel (as in ayant) and /ɛ.i/ before a consonant (as in pays).
In Cornish, it represents /aɪ/, /əɪ/, /ɛː/, or /eː/.

⟨a_e⟩ (a split digraph) is used in English for /eɪ/.

== B ==
⟨bb⟩ is used for /b/ in languages such as Nuosu, where ⟨b⟩ stands for /p/. It was used in Portuguese until 1911 in European orthography and 1943 in Brazilian orthography. It had the same sound as ⟨b⟩ and was only used for etymological purposes. In Hungarian, it represents geminated /bː/. In English, doubling a letter indicates that the previous vowel is short (so ⟨bb⟩ represents /b/). In ISO romanized Korean, it is used for the fortis sound /p͈/, otherwise spelled ⟨pp⟩; e.g. hobbang. In Hadza it represents the ejective /pʼ/. In several African languages it is implosive /ɓ/. In Cypriot Arabic it is /bʱ/.

⟨bd⟩ is used in English for /d/ in a few words of Greek origin, such as bdellatomy. When not initial, it represents /b.d/, as in abdicate.

⟨bf⟩ is used in Bavarian and several African languages for the /b̪͡v/.

⟨bh⟩ is used in transcriptions of Indo-Aryan languages for a murmured voiced bilabial plosive (/bʱ/), and for equivalent sounds in other languages. In Juǀʼhoan, it's used for the similar prevoiced aspirated plosive /b͡pʰ/. It is used in Irish to represent /w/ (beside ⟨a, o, u⟩) and /vʲ/ (beside ⟨e, i⟩), word-initially it marks the lenition of ⟨b⟩, e.g. mo bhád /mˠə waːd̪ˠ/ "my boat", bheadh /vʲɛx/ "would be". In Scottish Gaelic, it represents /v/, or in a few contexts as /w/~/u/ between a broad vowel and a broad consonant or between two broad vowels, as in labhair /l̪ˠau.ɪɾʲ/. In the orthography used in Guinea before 1985, ⟨bh⟩ was used in Pular (a Fula language) for the voiced bilabial implosive /ɓ/, whereas in Xhosa, Zulu, and Shona, ⟨b⟩ represents the implosive and ⟨bh⟩ represents the plosive /b/. In some orthographies of Dan, ⟨b⟩ is /b/ and ⟨bh⟩ is /ɓ/.

⟨bm⟩ is used in Cornish for an optionally pre-occluded /m/; that is, it represents either /m/ or /mː/ (in any position); /ᵇm/ (before a consonant or finally); or /bm/ (before a vowel); examples are mabm ('mother') or hebma ('this').

⟨bp⟩ is used in Sandawe and romanized Thai for /p/. ⟨bp⟩ (capital ⟨bP⟩) is used in Irish, as the eclipsis of ⟨p⟩, to represent /bˠ/ (beside ⟨a, o, u⟩) and /bʲ/ (beside ⟨e, i⟩).

⟨bv⟩ is used in the General Alphabet of Cameroon Languages for the voiced labiodental affricate /b̪͡v/.

⟨bz⟩ is used in Shona for a whistled sibilant cluster /bz͎/.

== C ==
⟨cc⟩ was formerly used in Spanish-based spelling systems for Quechua and Aymara for /q/, as in Ccozcco (modern Qusqu) ('Cuzco'). In Italian, ⟨cc⟩ before a front vowel represents a geminated /tʃ/, as in lacci /ˈlat.tʃi/. In Piedmontese and Lombard, ⟨cc⟩ represents /tʃ/ at the end of a word. In Hadza it is the glottalized click /ᵑǀˀ/. In English crip slang, ⟨cc⟩ can sometimes replace the letters ⟨ck⟩ or ⟨ct⟩ at the ends of words, such as with thicc, protecc, succ and fucc.

⟨cg⟩ was used for [ddʒ] or [gg] in Old English (ecg in Old English sounded like 'edge' in Modern English, while frocga sounded like 'froga'), where both are long consonants. It is used for the click /ǀχ/ in Naro, and in the Tindall orthography of Khoekhoe for the voiceless dental click /ǀ/.

⟨ch⟩ is used in several languages. In English, it can represent /tʃ/, /k/, /ʃ/, /x/ or /h/. See article.

⟨çh⟩ is used in Manx for /tʃ/, such as in the word çhengey ("speech"), as a distinction from ⟨ch⟩ which is used for /x/.

⟨cɥ⟩ is used in the 1644 orthography for Mochica, representing an undetermined palatal sound, possibly something like /c/ or /ʨ/.

⟨čh⟩ is used in Romani and the Chechen Latin alphabet for /tʃʰ/. In the Ossete Latin alphabet, it was used for /tʃʼ/.

⟨ci⟩ is used in the Italian for /tʃ/ before the non-front vowel letters ⟨a, o, u⟩. In English, it usually represents /ʃ/ whenever it precedes any vowel other than ⟨i⟩. In Polish, it represents /t͡ɕ/ whenever it precedes a vowel, and /t͡ɕi/ whenever it precedes a consonant (or in the end of the word), and is considered a graphic variant of ⟨ć⟩ appearing in other situations. In Romanian, it represents /tʃ/. The digraph is found at the end of a word (deci, atunci, copaci) or before ⟨a, o, u⟩ (ciorba, ciuleandra).

⟨cj⟩ is used in Friulian for /c/ such as in words cjocolate /cokoˈlate/. It's also used in local orthographies of Lombard to represent /tʃ/ derived from Latin ⟨cl⟩.

⟨ck⟩ is used in many Germanic languages in lieu of ⟨kk⟩ or ⟨cc⟩ to indicate either a geminated /kː/, or a /k/ with a preceding (historically) short vowel. The latter is the case with English tack, deck, pick, lock, and buck (compare backer with baker). In German, ⟨ck⟩ indicates that the preceding vowel is short. Prior to the German spelling reform of 1996, it was replaced by ⟨k-k⟩ for syllabification. The new spelling rules allow only syllabification of the ⟨ck⟩ as a whole:

- Old spelling: Säcke: Säk-ke ('sacks')
- New spelling: Säcke: Sä-cke
Among the modern Germanic languages, ⟨ck⟩ is used mainly in Alsatian, English, German, Luxembourgish, Scots, Swedish, and other West Germanic languages in Austria, Germany and Switzerland. Similarly, ⟨kk⟩ is used for the same purpose in Afrikaans, Danish, Dutch, Icelandic, Norwegian, and other West Germanic languages in the Netherlands and Belgium. Compare the word nickel, which is the same in many of these languages except for the customary ⟨ck⟩ or ⟨kk⟩ spelling. The word is nickel in English and Swedish, Nickel in German, and nikkel in Afrikaans, Danish, Dutch, Icelandic and Norwegian.
It was also used in the Tindall orthography of Khoekhoe for the voiceless dental click /ǀ/ (equivalent to ⟨cg⟩).
It is also used in Cornish for /k/ at the end of a syllable after a short vowel; only in loanwords (mostly from English) in the Standard Written Form (SWF), more widely in Kernowek Standard.

⟨cn⟩ is used in English for /n/ in a few words of Greek origin, such as cnidarian. When not initial, it represents /kn/, as in acne. It is used in Scottish Gaelic for /kʰɾ/, and nasalises the following vowel, as in cneap /kʰɾʲɛ̃hp/.

⟨cö⟩ is used in Seri for a labialized velar plosive, /kʷ/. It is placed between ⟨c⟩ and ⟨d⟩ in alphabetical order.

⟨cr⟩ is used in the General Alphabet of Cameroon Languages for /ʈʂ/.

⟨cs⟩ is used in the Hungarian for a voiceless postalveolar affricate, /tʃ/. It is considered a distinct letter, named csé, and is placed between ⟨c⟩ and ⟨d⟩ in alphabetical order. Examples of words with ⟨cs⟩ include csak ('only'), csésze ('cup'), cső ('pipe'), csípős ('peppery').

⟨ct⟩ is used in English for /t/ in a few words of Greek origin, such as ctenoid. When not initial, it represents /kt/, as in act. Is used in Portuguese for /t/ in some words, e.g. retrospecto but not in tacto.

⟨cu⟩ is used in languages such as Nahuatl (that is, based on Spanish or Portuguese orthography) for /kʷ/. In Nahuatl, ⟨cu⟩ is used before a vowel, whereas ⟨uc⟩ is used after a vowel.

⟨cw⟩ is used in modern scholarly editions of Old English for /kw/, which was spelled ⟨cƿ⟩, ⟨cuu⟩ or ⟨cu⟩ in manuscripts. In Middle English these were all replaced by Latin ⟨qu⟩.

⟨cx⟩ is used in Esperanto as an unofficial surrogate of ⟨ĉ⟩, which represents /tʃ/.

⟨cz⟩ is used in Polish for /ʈ͡ʂ/ as in cześć ('hello'). In Kashubian, ⟨cz⟩ represents /tʃ/. In French and Catalan, historical ⟨cz⟩ contracted to the ligature ⟨ç⟩, which represents /s/ when followed by ⟨a, o, u⟩. In Hungarian, it was formerly used for /ts/, which is now written ⟨c⟩. In English, ⟨cz⟩ is used to represent /tʃ/ in the loanwords Czech, Czechia, and Czechoslovakia.

== D ==
⟨dc⟩ is used in Naro for the click /ᶢǀ/, and in Juǀʼhoan for the prevoiced ejective /d͡tʃʼ/.

⟨dd⟩ is used in English to indicate a /d/ with a preceding (historically) short vowel (e.g. jaded /ˈdʒeɪdɪd/ has a "long a" while ladder /ˈlædər/ has a "short a"). In Welsh, ⟨dd⟩ represents a voiced dental fricative /ð/. It is treated as a distinct letter, named èdd, and placed between ⟨D⟩ and ⟨E⟩ in alphabetical order. In the ISO romanization of Korean, it is used for the fortis sound /t͈/, otherwise spelled ⟨tt⟩; examples are ddeokbokki and bindaeddeok. In Basque, it represents a voiced palatal plosive /ɟ/, as in onddo "mushroom". In several African languages it is implosive /ɗ/.

⟨dg⟩ is used in English for /dʒ/ in certain contexts, such as with judgement and hedge.

⟨dh⟩ is used in the Albanian, Swahili, and revived Cornish for the voiced dental fricative /ð/. The first examples of this digraph are from the Oaths of Strasbourg, the earliest French text, where it denotes the same sound /ð/ developed mainly from intervocalic Latin -t-. In early traditional Cornish ⟨ȝ⟩ (yogh), and later ⟨th⟩, were used for this purpose. Edward Lhuyd is credited for introducing the grapheme to Cornish orthography in 1707 in his Archaeologia Britannica. In Irish it represents /ɣ/ (beside ⟨a, o, u⟩) or /j/ (beside ⟨e, i⟩); at the beginning of a word it shows the lenition of ⟨d⟩, e.g. mo dhoras /mˠə ɣɔɾˠəsˠ/ "my door" (cf. doras /d̪ˠɔɾˠəsˠ/ "door"). In Scottish Gaelic it represents /ɣ/ (beside ⟨a, o, u⟩) or /ʝ/ or /j/ (beside ⟨e, i⟩).

In the pre-1985 orthography of Guinea, ⟨dh⟩ was used for the voiced alveolar implosive /ɗ/ in Pular. It is currently written ⟨ɗ⟩. In the orthography of Shona it is the opposite: ⟨dh⟩ represents /d/, and ⟨d⟩ /ɗ/. In the transcription of Australian Aboriginal languages, ⟨dh⟩ represents a dental stop, /t̪/.
In addition, ⟨dh⟩ is used in various romanization systems. In transcriptions of Indo-Aryan languages, for example, it represents the murmured voiced dental plosive /d̪ʱ/, and for equivalent sounds in other languages. It transcribes Dha (Indic). In Juǀʼhoan, it's used for the similar prevoiced aspirated plosive /d͡tʰ/. In the romanization of Arabic, it denotes ⟨ﺫ⟩, which represents /ð/ in Modern Standard Arabic.
Represents /ɖ/ in Javanese and Somali.

⟨dj⟩ is used in Faroese, Portuguese, French and many French-based orthographies for /dʒ/. In Jarai, it's used for /ʄ/. In the transcription of Australian Aboriginal languages such as Warlpiri, Arrernte, and Pitjantjatjara, it represents a postalveolar stop such as /ṯ/ or /ḏ/; this sound is also written ⟨dy⟩, ⟨tj⟩, ⟨ty⟩, or ⟨c⟩. It is also formerly used in Indonesian as /d͡ʒ/.

⟨dl⟩ is used in Hmong's Romanized Popular Alphabet for /tˡ/. In Navajo, it represents /tɬ/, and in Xhosa it represents /ɮ̈/. In Hadza it is ejective /cʎʼ/.

⟨dł⟩ is used in Tlingit for /tɬ/ (in Alaska, ⟨dl⟩ is used instead).

⟨dm⟩ is used in Yélî Dnye for doubly articulated and nasally released /t͡pn͡m/.

⟨dn⟩ is used in Yélî Dnye for nasally released /tn/. In Cornish, it is used for an optionally pre-occluded /n/; that is, it is pronounced either /n/ or /nː/ (in any position); /ᵈn/ (before a consonant or finally); or /dn/ (before a vowel); examples are pedn ('head') or pednow ('heads').

⟨dp⟩ is used in Yélî Dnye for doubly articulated /t͡p/.

⟨dq⟩ is used for the click /ᶢǃ/ in Naro.

⟨dr⟩ is used in Malagasy for /ɖʐ/. See ⟨tr⟩. It is used in Fijian for 'ndr' nasalized (/ɳɖr/). In some Amerindian languages it represents /ʈʂ/ as in Gwichʼin and sporadically /ɖ/ everywhere as in Paiwan and Maba

⟨ds⟩ is used in Juǀʼhoan for the prevoiced ejective /d͡tsʼ/.

⟨dt⟩ is used in German, Swedish, and Sandawe orthography as well as the romanization of Thai for /t/. ⟨dt⟩ (capital ⟨dT⟩) is used in Irish, as the eclipsis of ⟨t⟩, to represent /d̪ˠ/ (beside ⟨a, o, u⟩) and /tʲ/ (beside ⟨e, i⟩).

⟨dv⟩ is used in the General Alphabet of Cameroon Languages for the voiced dental affricate /d͡ð/.

⟨dx⟩ is used in some Zapotecan languages for a voiced postalveolar fricative /ʒ/. (It is placed between ⟨D⟩ and ⟨E⟩ in alphabetical order.) In Juǀʼhoan it is used for the prevoiced uvularized plosive /d͡tᵡ/.

⟨dy⟩ is used in Xhosa for /dʲʱ/. In Shona, it represents /dʒɡ/. In Tagalog it is used for /dʒ/. In the transcription of Australian Aboriginal languages such as Warlpiri, Arrernte, and Pitjantjatjara, it represents a postalveolar stop such as /ṯ/ or /ḏ/. This sound is also written ⟨tj⟩, ⟨dj⟩, ⟨ty⟩, ⟨c⟩, or ⟨j⟩.

⟨dz⟩ is used in several languages, often to represent /d͡z/. See article.

⟨dź⟩ is used in the Polish and Sorbian alphabets for /d͡ʑ/, the voiced alveolo-palatal affricate, as in dźwięk /d͡ʑvʲɛŋk/. ⟨dź⟩ is never written before a vowel (⟨dzi⟩ is used instead, as in dziecko /d͡ʑɛt͡skɔ/ 'child').

⟨dż⟩ is used in the Polish for a voiced retroflex affricate /ɖ͡ʐ/ (e.g. dżem 'jam').

⟨dž⟩ is used in Serbo-Croatian, Slovak, Lithuanian, and Latvian to represent /d͡ʒ/. See article.

== E ==
⟨e′⟩ is used in Taa, where it represents the glottalised or creaky vowel /ḛ/.

⟨ea⟩ is used in many languages. In English, ⟨ea⟩ usually represents the monophthong /iː/ as in meat; due to a sound change that happened in Middle English, it also often represents the vowel /ɛ/ as in sweat. Rare pronunciations occur, like /eɪ/ in break, great, steak, and yea, and /ɔː/ in the archaic ealdorman. When followed by ⟨r⟩, it can represent the standard outcomes of the previously mentioned three vowels in this environment: /ɪər/ as in beard, /ɜːr/ as in heard, and /ɛər/ as in bear, respectively; as another exception, /ɑːr/ occurs in the words hearken, heart, and hearth. It often represents two independent vowels, like /eɪ.ɑː/ (seance), /i.æ/ (reality), /i.eɪ/ (create), and /i.ɪ/ or /i.ə/ (lineage). Unstressed, it may represent /jə/ (ocean) and /ɪ/ or /ə/ (Eleanor). In Romanian, it represents the diphthong /e̯a/ as in beată ('drunk female'). In Irish, ⟨ea⟩ represents /a/ between a slender and a broad consonant. In Scottish Gaelic, ⟨ea⟩ represents /ʲa/, /ɛ/ or /e/ between a slender and a broad context, depending on context or dialect. In Old English, it represents the diphthong /æɑ̯/. ⟨Ea⟩ is also the transliteration of the ⟨ᛠ⟩ rune of the Anglo-Frisian Futhorc.

⟨eá⟩ is used in Irish for /aː/ between a slender and a broad consonant.

⟨eà⟩ is used in Scottish Gaelic for /ʲaː/ between a slender and a broad consonant.

⟨éa⟩ is used in Irish for /eː/ between a slender and a broad consonant.

⟨èa⟩ is used in Scottish Gaelic for /ia/ between a slender and a broad consonant, unless the broad consonant is m, mh, or p, in which case it represents /ɛ/.

⟨ee⟩ represents a long mid vowel in a number of languages. In English, ⟨ee⟩ represents /iː/ as in teen. In Dutch and German, ⟨ee⟩ represents /eː/ (though it is pronounced [eɪ] in majority of northern Dutch dialects). In the Cantonese Romanisation, it represents /iː/, or /ei/ for characters which might be pronounced as /iː/ in other dialects. In Bouyei, ⟨ee⟩ is used for plain /e/, as ⟨e⟩ stands for /ɯ/.

⟨eh⟩ is used in Taa for the murmured vowel /e̤/. In the Wade-Giles transliteration of Mandarin Chinese, it is used for /ɛ/ after a consonant, as in yeh /jɛ/. In German, ⟨eh⟩ represents /eː/, as in Reh.

⟨ei⟩ This digraph was taken over from Middle High German, where it represented /ei/. It usually represents a diphthong. In Modern German, ⟨ei⟩ is predominant in representing /aɪ/, as in Einstein, while the equivalent digraph ⟨ai⟩ appears in only a few words. In English, ⟨ei⟩ can represent many sounds, including /eɪ/, as in vein, /i/ as in seize, /aɪ/ as in heist, /ɛ/ as in heifer, /æ/ as in enceinte, and /ɪ/ or /ə/ as in forfeit. See also I before e except after c. In southern and western Faroese dialects, it represents the diphthong /aɪ/, while in northern and eastern dialects, it represents the diphthong /ɔɪ/. In Portuguese, ⟨ei⟩ represents /ɐj/ in Greater Lisbon, so are ⟨éi⟩ and ⟨êi⟩, but /ej ~ e/ or /ɛj/ in Brazil, East Timor, Macau, rest of Portugal, and Portuguese-speaking African countries.

In Welsh and Afrikaans, ⟨ei⟩ represents /əi/. In Irish and Scottish Gaelic, it represents /ɛ/ or /e/, or /ɪ/ when unstressed, before a slender consonant. In Dutch, ⟨ei⟩ represents /ɛi/. In French, ⟨ei⟩ represents /ɛ/, as in seiche.

In Hepburn romanization of the Japanese language it is used for /eː/.

⟨eî⟩ is used in French for /ɛː/, as in reître /ʁɛːtʁ/.

⟨éi⟩ is used in Irish for /eː/ between slender consonants.

⟨èi⟩ is used in Scottish Gaelic for /ɛː/ or /eː/ between slender consonants.

⟨ej⟩ is used in Swedish in some short words, such as leja /leːja/ or nej /nɛj/.

⟨em⟩ is used in Portuguese for /ɐĩ̯ ~ ẽĩ̯/ at the end of a word and /ẽ/ before a consonant. In French orthography, it represents a /ɑ̃/ when it is followed by ⟨b⟩ or ⟨p⟩.

⟨ẽm⟩ is used in Portuguese for /ẽĩ/ at the end of a word.

⟨ém⟩ is used in Portuguese for /ɐĩ̯ ~ ẽĩ̯/ at the end of a word.

⟨êm⟩ is used in Portuguese for /ɐĩ̯ ~ ẽĩ̯/ at the end of a word and /ẽ/ before a consonant.

⟨en⟩ is used in Portuguese for /ɐĩ̯ ~ ẽĩ̯/ at the end of a word followed or not by an /s/ as in hífen or hifens; and for /ẽ/ before a consonant within a word. In French, it represents /ɑ̃/ or /ɛ̃/.

⟨én⟩ is used in Portuguese for /ɐĩ̯ ~ ẽĩ̯/ before a consonant.

⟨ên⟩ is used in Portuguese for /ẽ/ before a consonant.

⟨eo⟩ is used in Irish for /oː/ (/ɔ/ in 4 words) between a slender and a broad consonant. In Scottish Gaelic it is used for /ʲɔ/ between a slender and a broad consonant. In the Jyutping romanization of Cantonese, it represents /ɵ/, an allophone of /œː/, while in the Cantonese Romanisation, it represents /œː/. In the Revised Romanization of Korean, ⟨eo⟩ represents the open-mid back unrounded vowel /ʌ/, and in Piedmontese it is /ɛu̯/. In English ⟨eo⟩ is a rare digraph without a single pronunciation, representing /ɛ/ in feoff, jeopardy, leopard and the given names Geoffrey and Leonard, /iː/ in people, /oʊ/ in yeoman and /juː/ in the archaic feodary, while in the originally Gaelic name MacLeod it represents /aʊ/. However, usually it represents two vowels, like /iː.ə/ in leotard and galleon, /iː.oʊ/ in stereo and, /iː.ɒ/ in geodesy, and, uniquely, /uː.iː/ in geoduck.

⟨eò⟩ is used in Scottish Gaelic for /jɔː/ word-initially, and /ɔː/ elsewhere.

⟨eq⟩ is used in Taa for the pharyngealized vowel /eˤ/.

⟨eu⟩ is found in many languages, most commonly for the diphthong /eu/. Additionally, in English, ⟨eu⟩ represents /juː/ as in neuter (/uː/ in yod-dropping accents); however, the ⟨eu⟩ in "maneuver/manoeuvre" always represents /uː/ even in most non yod-dropping accents. In German, it represents /ɔʏ/ as in Deutsch; and in French, Dutch, Breton, and Piedmontese, it represents /ø/. In Cornish, it represents either long /øː ~ œː/ and short /œ/ or long /eː/ and short /ɛ/. In Scottish Gaelic it normally represents /ia/, as in beul /pial̪ˠ/, except when preceding ⟨m⟩ (e.g. leum /ʎeːm/) and usually ⟨b, mh, bh⟩, or in certain high-register words such as treun /t̪ʰɾeːn/ where it represents /eː/, and in southern dialects it is /eː/ in most contexts. In Yale romanization of Cantonese it represents /ɵ ~ œː/, while in the Cantonese Romanisation, it represents /œː/. In romanization of Wu Chinese, it represents /ø/, depending on the lect. In Sundanese, it represents /ɤ/ as in beureum ('red'). In the Revised Romanization of Korean and Acehnese, it represents /ɯ/.

⟨eû⟩ is used in French for /ø/, as in jeûne /ʒøn/.

⟨ew⟩ is used in English for /juː/ as in few and flew. An exception is the pronunciation /oʊ/ in sew, leading to the heteronym sewer (/ˈsuːər/, 'drain') vs sewer (/ˈsoʊər/, 'one who sews'). In Cornish, it stands for /ɛʊ/.

⟨êw⟩ is used in the Kernowek Standard orthography of Cornish for either /ɛʊ/ or /oʊ/. This distribution can also be written ⟨ôw⟩.

⟨ey⟩ is used in English for a variety of sounds, including /eɪ/ in they, /iː/ in key, and /aɪ/ in geyser. In Faroese, it represents the diphthong /ɛɪ/. In Cornish, it represents the diphthong /ɛɪ/ or /əɪ/.

⟨e_e⟩ (a split digraph) is used in English 'long e', historically for Middle English /eː/ which evolved into /iː/.

⟨eⁿ⟩ is used for /ẽ/ in Hokkien Pe̍h-ōe-jī.

== F ==
⟨ff⟩, which may be written as the typographic ligature ⟨ﬀ⟩, is used in English and Cornish for the same sound as single ⟨f⟩, /f/. The doubling is used to indicate that the preceding vowel is (historically) short, or for etymological reasons, in latinisms. Very rarely, ⟨ff⟩ may be found word-initially in English, such as in proper names (e.g., Rose ffrench, Jasper Fforde). In Welsh, ⟨ff⟩ represents /f/, while ⟨f⟩ represents /v/. In Welsh, ⟨ff⟩ is considered a distinct letter, and placed between ⟨f⟩ and ⟨g⟩ in alphabetical order. In medieval Breton, vowel nasalisation was represented by a following ⟨ff⟩. This notation was reformed during the 18th century, though proper names retain the former convention, which leads to occasional mispronunciation.

⟨fh⟩ is used in Irish and Scottish Gaelic for the lenition of ⟨f⟩. This happens to be silent, so that ⟨fh⟩ in Gaelic corresponds to no sound at all, e.g. the Irish phrase cá fhad /kaː ˈad̪ˠ/ "how long", where fhad is the lenited form of fad /fˠad̪ˠ/ "long". However, in three Scottish Gaelic words, fhèin, fhuair, and fhathast, it is pronounced as /h/.

⟨fx⟩ is used in Nambikwara for a glottalized /ɸʔ/.

== G ==
⟨gʻ⟩ is used in Uzbek to represent /ɣ/.

⟨gb⟩ is used in some African languages for a voiced labial-velar plosive, /ɡ͡b/.

⟨gc⟩ is used in languages, such as Xhosa and Zulu, for the click /ᶢǀ/. ⟨gc⟩ (capital ⟨gC⟩) is used in Irish, as the eclipsis of ⟨c⟩, to represent /g/ (beside ⟨a, o, u⟩) and /ɟ/ (beside ⟨e, i⟩).

⟨ge⟩ is used in French for /ʒ/ before ⟨a, o, u⟩ as in geôle /ʒol/.

⟨gg⟩ is used in English for /ɡ/ before ⟨y⟩, ⟨i⟩ and ⟨e⟩ (e.g. doggy). It is also used for /ɡ/ in Chinese languages such as Nuosu. In Central Alaskan Yup'ik, it represents /x/. In Greenlandic, it represents /çː/. In the ISO romanization of Korean, it is used for the fortis sound /k͈/, otherwise spelled ⟨kk⟩ (e.g. ggakdugi). In Hadza it is ejective /kxʼ/. In Italian, ⟨gg⟩ before a front vowel represents a geminated /dʒ/, as in legge /ˈled.dʒe/. In Piedmontese and Lombard, ⟨gg⟩ is an etymological spelling representing an /tʃ/ at the end of a word which is the unvoicing of an ancient /dʒ/.

⟨gh⟩ is used in several languages. In English, it can be silent or represent /ɡ/ or /f/. See article.

⟨gi⟩ is used in Vietnamese for /z/ in northern dialects and /j/ in the southern ones. In Italian, it represents /dʒ/ before the non-front vowel letters ⟨a o u⟩. In Romansh it represents /dʑ/ before ⟨a o u⟩ (written ⟨g⟩ before front vowels).

⟨gj⟩ is used in Albanian for the voiced palatal plosive /ɟ/, though for Gheg speakers it represents /dʒ/. In the Arbëresh dialect, it represents the voiced velar plosive /ɡʲ/. In Norwegian and Swedish ⟨gj⟩ represents /j/ in words like gjorde ('did'). In Faroese, it represents /dʒ/. It is also used in the Romanization of Macedonian as a Latin equivalent of Cyrillic ⟨Ѓ⟩. Also, it's used in Friulian to represent /ɟ/ (whilst /dʒ/ is one of the pronunciations of the letter ⟨z⟩). It can be found in some local orthographies of Lombard to represent /dʒ/ derived from Latin ⟨gl⟩. Before the letter Đ was introduced into Gaj's Latin alphabet in 1878, the digraph ⟨gj⟩ had been used instead; and it remained in use till the beginning of the 20th century.

⟨gk⟩ is used in Sandawe and the romanization of Thai for /k/; in Limburgish it represents /ɡ/. Modern Greek uses the equivalent digraph γκ for /g/, as γ is used for /ɣ/ ~ /ʝ/.

⟨gl⟩ is used in Italian and some African languages for /ʎ/.

⟨gm⟩ is used in English for /m/ in a few words of Greek origin, such as phlegm and paradigm. Between vowels, it simply represents /ɡ.m/, as in paradigmatic.

⟨gn⟩ is used in Latin, where it represented /ŋn/ in the classical period. Latin velar-coronal sequences like this (and also ⟨cl cr ct gd gl gr x⟩) underwent a palatal mutation to varying degrees in most Italo-Western Romance languages. For most languages that preserve the ⟨gn⟩ spelling (such as Italian and French), it represents a palatal nasal /ɲ/ (or more precisely /ɲː/ in Italian), and is similarly used in Romanization schemes such as Wugniu for /ȵ/. This was not the case in Dalmatian and the Eastern Romance languages where a different mutation changed the velar component to a labial consonant as well as the spelling to ⟨mn⟩. In Portuguese, ⟨gn⟩ represents /n/, as if there was no ⟨g⟩, e.g. assignatura, signal, impregnado and plurissignificação. It is used in Scottish Gaelic for /kr/, and nasalises the following vowel, as in gnè /krʲɛ̃ː/.

In English, ⟨gn⟩ represents /n/ initially (see /gn/ reduction) and finally (i.e. gnome, gnu, benign, sign). When it appears between two syllables, it represents /ɡ.n/ (e.g. signal). In Norwegian and Swedish, ⟨gn⟩ represents /ŋn/ in monosyllabic words like agn, and between two syllables, tegne. Initially, it represents /ɡn/, e.g. Swedish gnista /ˈɡnɪsta/.

⟨gñ⟩ was used in several Spanish-derived orthographies of the Pacific for /ŋ/. It is one of several variants of the digraph ⟨ñg⟩, and is preserved in the name of the town of Sagñay, Philippines.

⟨go⟩ is used in Piedmontese for /ɡw/ (like the “gu” in Guatemala).

⟨gq⟩ is used in languages, such as Xhosa and Zulu, for the click /ᶢǃ/. In the Taa language, it represents /ɢ/.

⟨gr⟩ is used in Xhosa for /ɣ̈/.

⟨gu⟩ is used in English, Spanish, French, Portuguese and Catalan for /ɡ/ before front vowels ⟨i e⟩ (⟨i e y⟩ in English and French) where a "soft g" pronunciation (English /dʒ/; Spanish /x/; French, Portuguese and Catalan /ʒ/) would otherwise occur. In English, it can also be used to represent /ɡw/. In the Ossete Latin alphabet, it is used for /ɡʷ/.

⟨gü⟩ is used in Spanish, Catalan and formerly Portuguese for /ɡw/ before front vowels ⟨i e⟩ where the digraph ⟨gu⟩ would otherwise represent /ɡ/.

⟨gv⟩ is used for /kʷ/ in Standard Zhuang and in Bouyei. In the General Alphabet of Cameroon Languages it is used for the labialized fricative /ɣʷ/.

⟨gw⟩ is used in various languages for /ɡʷ/, and in Dene Suline it represents /kʷ/.

⟨ǥw⟩, capital ⟨Ǥw⟩ (or ⟨G̱w⟩), is used in Tlingit for /qʷ/ (in Alaska); in Canada, this sound is represented by ⟨ghw⟩.

⟨gx⟩ is used in languages, such as Xhosa and Zulu, for the click /ᶢǁ/. In Esperanto, it is an unofficial surrogate of ⟨ĝ⟩, which represents /dʒ/.

⟨gy⟩ is used in Hungarian for a voiced palatal plosive /ɟ/. In Hungarian, the letter's name is gyé. It is considered a single letter, and acronyms keep the digraph intact. The letter appears frequently in Hungarian words, such as the word for "Hungarian" itself: magyar. In the old orthography of Bouyei, it was used for /tɕ/. It is also commonly used in Burmese romanization schemes to represent /dʒ/.

⟨gǃ⟩ is used in Juǀʼhoan for the voiced alveolar click /ᶢǃ/.

⟨gǀ⟩ is used in Juǀʼhoan for the voiced dental click /ᶢǀ/.

⟨gǁ⟩ is used in Juǀʼhoan for the voiced lateral click /ᶢǁ/.

⟨gǂ⟩ is used in Juǀʼhoan for the voiced palatal click /ᶢǂ/.

== H ==
⟨hh⟩ is used in Xhosa to write the murmured glottal fricative /ɦ̤/, though this is often written ⟨h⟩. In the Iraqw language, ⟨hh⟩ is the voiceless epiglottal fricative /ʜ/, and in Chipewyan it is a velar/uvular /χ/. In Esperanto orthography, it is an official surrogate of ⟨ĥ⟩, which represents /x/.

⟨hj⟩ is used in the Italian dialect of Albanian for /xʲ/. In Faroese, it represents either /tʃ/ or /j/, and in Swedish, Danish and Norwegian, it represents /j/. In Icelandic it is used to denote /ç/.

⟨hl⟩ is used for /ɬ/ or /l̥/ in various alphabets, such as the Romanized Popular Alphabet used to write Hmong (/ɬ/) and Icelandic (/l̥/). See also reduction of Old English /hl/.

⟨hm⟩ is used in the Romanized Popular Alphabet used to write Hmong, where it represents /m̥/.

⟨hn⟩ is used in the Romanized Popular Alphabet used to write Hmong, where it represents /n̥/. It is also used in Icelandic to denote the same phoneme. See also reduction of Old English /hn/.

⟨hr⟩ is used for /ɣ/ in Bouyei. In Icelandic it is used for /r̥/. See also reduction of Old English /hr/.

⟨hs⟩ is used in the Wade-Giles transcription of Mandarin Chinese for /ɕ/, equivalent to Hanyu Pinyin ⟨x⟩.

⟨hu⟩ is used primarily in the Classical Nahuatl language, in which it represents /w/ before a vowel; for example, Wikipedia in Nahuatl is written Huiquipedia. After a vowel, ⟨uh⟩ is used. In the Ossete Latin alphabet, ⟨hu⟩ was used for /ʁʷ/, similar to French roi. The sequence ⟨hu⟩ is also found in Spanish words such as huevo or hueso; however, in Spanish this is not a digraph but a simple sequence of silent ⟨h⟩ and the vowel ⟨u⟩.

⟨hv⟩ is used Faroese and Icelandic for /kv/ (often /kf/), generally in wh-words, but also in other words, such as Faroese hvonn. In the General Alphabet of Cameroon Languages it is used for the supposed fricative /ɣ͜β/.

⟨hw⟩ is used in modern editions of Old English for /hw/, originally spelled ⟨huu⟩ or ⟨hƿ⟩ (the latter with the wynn letter). In its descendants in modern English, it is now spelled ⟨wh⟩ (see there for more details). It is used in some orthographies of Cornish for /ʍ/.

⟨hx⟩ is used for /h/ in Chinese languages such as Nuosu (where ⟨h⟩ alone represents the fricative /x/). In Nambikwara it is a glottalized /hʔ/. In Esperanto orthography, it is an unofficial surrogate of ⟨ĥ⟩, which represents /x/.

⟨hy⟩ is used in Hepburn romanization of the Japanese language to transcribe /ç/, which is the syllable hi before a y-vowel, such as hya, hyu, and hyo, which appear in Chinese loanwords. Was also used in Portuguese until 1947. It appeared in words like: Hydroginástica and Hypóthese.

== I ==
⟨i′⟩ is used in Taa to represent the glottalized or creaky vowel /ḭ/.

⟨ia⟩ is used in Irish and Scottish Gaelic for the diphthong /iə/.

⟨ie⟩ is used in English, where it usually represents /aɪ/ as in pries and allied or /iː/ as in priest and rallied. Unique pronunciations are /ɪ/ in sieve, /ɛ/ in friend, and /eɪ/ in lingerie. Unstressed it can represent /jə/, as in spaniel and conscience, or /ɪ/ or /ə/ as in mischief and hurriedly. It also can represent many vowel combinations, including /aɪə/ in diet and client, /aɪɛ/ in diester and quiescent, /iːə/ in alien and skier, /iːɛ/ in oriental and hygienic, and /iːiː/ in British medieval.

In Dutch and Afrikaans, ⟨ie⟩ represents the tense vowel /i/. In German, it may represent the lengthened vowel /iː/ as in Liebe (love) as well as the vowel combination /iə/ as in Belgien (Belgium). In Latvian and Lithuanian, ⟨ie⟩ is considered two letters for all purposes and represents /iæ̯/, commonly (although less precisely) transcribed as /i̯e/. In Maltese, ⟨ie⟩ is a distinct letter and represents a long close front unrounded vowel, /iː/ or /iɛ/. It is used to write the vowel /e/ in Chinese languages such as Nuosu, where ⟨e⟩ stands for /ɛ/. In Old English ⟨ie⟩ was one of the common diphthongs, the umlauted version of ⟨ea⟩ and ⟨eo⟩. Its value is not entirely clear, and in Middle English it had become /e/.

⟨îe⟩ is used in Afrikaans for /əːə/.

⟨ig⟩ is used in Catalan for /t͡ʃ/ in the coda.

⟨ih⟩, is used in Taa to represent the breathy or murmured vowel /i̤/. It is also used in Tongyong Pinyin and Wade-Giles transcription for the fricative vowels of Mandarin Chinese, which are spelled ⟨i⟩ in Hanyu Pinyin.

⟨ii⟩ is used in many languages such as Portuguese (e.g. Aniilar, Sacerdócii) and Finnish (e.g. Riikka, Niinistö, Siitala, Riikkeli), Italian (e.g. Riina), Estonian (e.g. Riik), Scots (e.g. Auld Nii, Iisay), with phonemic long vowels for /iː/.

⟨ií⟩ is used in Portuguese for /iji/.

⟨ij⟩ is used in Dutch for /ɛi/. See article.

⟨il⟩ is used in French for /j/, historically /ʎ/, as in ail /aj/ "garlic". Can also be written as ⟨ille⟩ as in vieille /vjɛj/.

⟨im⟩ is used in Portuguese for /ĩ/.

⟨ím⟩ is used in Portuguese for /ĩ/ before a consonant.

⟨ĩm⟩ is used in Portuguese for the diphthong /ĩə/.

⟨in⟩ is used in many languages to write a nasal vowel. In Portuguese before a consonant, and in many West African languages, it is /ĩ/, while in French it is /ɛ̃/.

⟨ín⟩ is used in Portuguese for /ĩ/ before a consonant.

⟨în⟩ is used in French for the vowel /ɛ̃/ that was once followed by a historical ⟨s⟩, as in vous vîntes /vu vɛ̃t/ "you came".

⟨iŋ⟩ is used in Lakota for the nasal vowel /ĩ/.

⟨io⟩ is used in Irish for /ɪ/, /ʊ/, and /iː/ between a slender and a broad consonant. In Scottish Gaelic it is used for /i/ and sometimes /(j)ũ(ː)/ between a slender and a broad consonant.

⟨ío⟩ is used in Irish for /iː/ between a slender and a broad consonant.

⟨ìo⟩ is used in Scottish Gaelic for /iː/ and /iə/ between a slender and a broad consonant.

⟨iq⟩ is used in Taa to represent the pharyngealized vowel /iˤ/.

⟨iu⟩ is used in Irish for /ʊ/ between a slender and a broad consonant. In Scottish Gaelic, it is used for /(j)u/ between a slender and a broad consonant. In Hanyu Pinyin, it is /i̯ou̯/ after a consonant. (In initial position, this is spelled ⟨you⟩).

⟨iú⟩ is used in Irish for /uː/ between a slender and a broad consonant.

⟨iù⟩ is used in Scottish Gaelic for /(j)uː/ between a slender and a broad consonant.

⟨iw⟩ is used in Welsh and Cornish for the diphthong /iʊ/ or /ɪʊ/.

⟨ix⟩ is used in Catalan for /ʃ/ (Eastern Catalan) or /jʃ/ (Western Catalan) after a vowel.

⟨i_e⟩ (a split digraph) indicates an English 'long i', historically iː but now most commonly realised as /aɪ/.

== J ==
⟨jh⟩ is used in Walloon to write a consonant that is variously /h/, /ʒ/ or /ç/, depending on the dialect. In Tongyong Pinyin, it represents /tʂ/, written ⟨zh⟩ in Hanyu Pinyin. ⟨jh⟩ is also the standard transliteration for the Devanāgarī letter ⟨झ⟩ /dʒʱ/. In Esperanto, it is an official surrogate of ⟨ĵ⟩, which represents /ʒ/. In Latin American Spanish, it is sometimes used in first names (like Jhon and Jhordan) to represent /ɟʝ/ and distinguish it from the typical sound of ⟨j⟩ in Spanish, /x/.

⟨jj⟩ is used for /dʑ/ in Chinese languages such as Nuosu. In romanized Korean, it represents the fortis sound /tɕ͈/. In Hadza it is ejective /tʃʼ/.

⟨jö⟩ is used as a letter of the Seri alphabet, where it represents a labialized velar fricative, /xʷ/. It is placed between J and L in alphabetical order.

⟨jl⟩ is used in Bade for the Voiceless lateral fricative.

⟨jr⟩ is used in the General Alphabet of Cameroon Languages for /ɖʐ/.

⟨jx⟩ is used in Esperanto as an unofficial surrogate of ⟨ĵ⟩, which represents /ʒ/.

== K ==
⟨k'⟩ is used in Nuxalk for /kʼ/.

⟨kg⟩ is used for /kχ/ in southern African languages such as Setswana and Sotho. For instance, the Kalahari is spelled Kgalagadi /kχalaχadi/ in Setswana.

⟨kh⟩, in transcriptions of Indo-Aryan and Dravidian languages, represents the aspirated voiceless velar plosive (/kʰ/). For most other languages, it represents the voiceless velar fricative /x/, for example in transcriptions of the letter ḫāʾ (خ) in standard Arabic, standard Persian, and Urdu, Cyrillic Х, х (kha), Spanish ⟨j⟩, as well as the Hebrew letter kaf (כ) in instances when it is lenited. When used for transcription of the letter ḥet (ח) in Sephardic Hebrew, it represents the voiceless pharyngeal fricative /ħ/. In Canadian Tlingit it represents /qʰ/, which in Alaska is written ⟨k⟩. In the Ossete Latin alphabet, it was used for /kʼ/.

⟨kj⟩ is used Swedish and Norwegian for /ɕ/ or /ç/. See also ⟨tj⟩. In Faroese, it represents /tʃ/. In the romanization of Macedonian, it represents /c/.

⟨kk⟩ is used in romanized Korean for the fortis sound /k͈/, in Haida (Bringhurst orthography) for ejective /kʼ/, and in Cypriot Arabic for /kʰː/.

⟨kl⟩ is used in Zulu to write a sound variously realized as /kʟ̥ʼ/ or /kxʼ/.

⟨km⟩ is used in Yélî Dnye doubly articulated and nasally released /k͡pŋ͡m/.

⟨kn⟩ is used in English to write /n/ (formerly pronounced /kn/) at the beginning of some words of Germanic origin, such as knee and knife. It is used in Yélî Dnye for nasally released /kŋ/.

⟨kp⟩ is used as a letter in some African languages, where it represents a voiceless labial-velar plosive /k͡p/.

⟨kr⟩ is used in Xhosa for /kxʼ/.

⟨ks⟩ is used in Cornish for either /ks/ or /ɡz/.

⟨ku⟩ is used in Purépecha for /kʷ/. It also had that value in the Ossete Latin alphabet.

⟨kv⟩ is used for /k^{wh}/ in some dialects of Zhuang.

⟨kw⟩ is used in various languages for the labialized velar consonant /kʷ/, and in Dene Suline (Chipewyan) for /k^{wh}/. Used informally in English for phonemic spelling of qu, as in kwik (from quick), ultimately from Proto-Indo-European */ɡʷ/.

⟨ḵw⟩ is used in Alaskan Tlingit for /q^{wh}/, which in Canada is written ⟨khw⟩.

⟨kx⟩ in used in Nambikwara for a glottalized /kʔ/, and in Juǀʼhoan for the ejective /kxʼ/.

⟨ky⟩ is used in Tibetan Pinyin for /tʃʰ/. It is commonly used in Burmese romanization schemes to represent /tʃ/ (⟨ch⟩ is already used to represent aspirated /tʃʰ/).

== L ==
⟨lh⟩, in Occitan, Gallo, and Portuguese, represents a palatal lateral approximant /ʎ/. In many Indigenous languages of the Americas it represents a voiceless alveolar lateral fricative /ɬ/. In the transcription of Australian Aboriginal languages it represents a dental lateral, /l̪/. In the Gwoyeu Romatzyh romanization of Mandarin Chinese, initial ⟨lh⟩ indicates an even tone on a syllable beginning in /l/, which is otherwise spelled ⟨l⟩. In Middle Welsh it was sometimes used to represent /ɬ/ as well as ⟨ll⟩, in modern Welsh it has been replaced by ⟨ll⟩. In Tibetan, it represents the voiceless alveolar lateral approximant /ɬ/, as in Lhasa.

⟨lj⟩ is a letter in some Slavic languages, such as the Latin orthographies of Serbo-Croatian, where it represents a palatal lateral approximant /ʎ/. For example, the word ljiljan is pronounced /ʎiʎan/. Ljudevit Gaj first used the digraph ⟨lj⟩ in 1830; he devised it by analogy with a Cyrillic digraph, which developed into the ligature ⟨љ⟩. In Swedish, it represents /j/ in initial position e.g. ljus.

The sound /ʎ/ is written ⟨gl⟩ in Italian, in Castilian Spanish and Catalan as ⟨ll⟩, in Portuguese as ⟨lh⟩, in some Hungarian dialects as ⟨lly⟩, and in Latvian as ⟨ļ⟩. In Czech and Slovak, it is often transcribed as ⟨ľ⟩; it is used more frequently in the latter language. While there are dedicated Unicode codepoints, U+01C7 (Ǉ), U+01C8 (ǈ) and U+01C9 (ǉ), these are included for backwards compatibility (with legacy encodings for Serbo-Croatian which kept a one-to-one correspondence with Cyrillic Љљ) and modern texts use a sequence of Basic Latin characters.

⟨ll⟩ and ⟨l·l⟩ are used in several languages. See article.

⟨ḷḷ⟩ is used in Asturian for a sound that was historically /ʎ/ but which is now an affricate, [t͡s], [t͡ʃ], [d͡ʒ].

⟨lr⟩ is used in the General Alphabet of Cameroon Languages for /ɭ /.

⟨lv⟩ is used in Yélî Dnye for doubly articulated /l͜β/.

⟨lw⟩ is used for /lʷ/ in Arrernte.

⟨lx⟩ is used in Nambikwara for a glottalized /ˀl/.

⟨ly⟩ is used in Hungarian. See article.

== M ==
⟨mb⟩, in many African languages, represents /mb/ or /ᵐb/. In English, it represents /m/ when final, as in lamb (see reduction of /mb/). In Standard Zhuang and in Bouyei, ⟨mb⟩ is used for /ɓ/. ⟨mb⟩ (capital ⟨mB⟩) is used word initially in Irish, as the eclipsis of ⟨b⟩, to represent /mˠ/ (beside ⟨a, o, u⟩) and /mʲ/ (beside ⟨e, i⟩); e.g. ár mbád /aːɾˠ mˠaːd̪ˠ/ "our boat" (cf. /bˠaːd̪ˠ/ "boat"), i mBaile Átha Cliath "in Dublin".

⟨md⟩ is used in Yélî Dnye for doubly articulated and prenasalized /n͡mt͡p/.

⟨mf⟩, in many African languages, represents /mf/ or /ᵐf/.

⟨mg⟩ is used for /ŋɡ/ in Chinese languages such as Nuosu, where the more common digraph ⟨ng⟩ is restricted to /ŋ/. It is used in Yélî Dnye for doubly articulated and prenasalized /ŋ͡mk͡p/. It is also used in Filipino.

⟨mh⟩ is used in Irish, as the lenition of ⟨m⟩, to represent /w/ (beside ⟨a, o, u⟩) and /vʲ/ (beside ⟨e, i⟩), e.g. mo mháthair /mˠə ˈwaːhəɾʲ/ "my mother" (cf. máthair /ˈmˠaːhəɾʲ/ 'mother'). In Scottish Gaelic, it represents /v/, or in a few contexts as /w/~/u/ between a broad vowel and a broad consonant or between two broad vowels, as in reamhar /ˈrˠɛ̃ũ.əɾ/. In Welsh it stands for the nasal mutation of ⟨p⟩ and represents the voiceless /m̥/; for example fy mhen /və m̥ɛn/ 'my head' (cf. pen /pɛn/ 'head'). In both languages it is considered a sequence of the two letters ⟨m⟩ and ⟨h⟩ for purposes of alphabetization. In Shona, Juǀʼhoan and several other languages, it is used for a murmured /m̤/. In the Gwoyeu Romatzyh romanization of Mandarin Chinese, initial ⟨mh⟩- indicates an even tone on a syllable beginning in /m/, which is otherwise spelled ⟨m⟩-. In several languages, such as Gogo, it's a voiceless /m̥/.

⟨ml⟩ is used in the Romanized Popular Alphabet used to write Hmong, where it represents /mˡ/.

⟨mm⟩ is used in Haida (Bringhurst orthography) for glottalized /ˀm/. It is used in Cornish for an optionally pre-occluded /m/; that is, it is pronounced either /m/ or /mː/ (in any position); /ᵇm/ (before a consonant or finally); or /bm/ (before a vowel); examples are mamm ('mother') or hemma ('this').

⟨mn⟩ is used in English to write /n/ at the beginning of a few words of Greek origin, such as mnemonic. When final, it represents /m/, as in damn or hymn, and between vowels it represents /m/ as in damning, or /mn/ as in damnation (see /mn/-reduction). In French it represents /n/, as in automne and condamner.

⟨mp⟩, in many African languages, represents /mp/ or /ᵐp/. Modern Greek uses the equivalent digraph μπ for /b/, as β is used for /v/. In Mpumpong of Cameroon, ⟨mp⟩ is a plain /p/.

⟨mq⟩ is used in Juǀʼhoan for a pharyngealized or perhaps creaky /m̰/.

⟨mt⟩ is used in Yélî Dnye for doubly articulated and prenasalized /n̪͡mt̪͡p/.

⟨mv⟩, in many African languages, represents /mv/ or /ᵐv/.

⟨mw⟩ is used for /mʷ/ in Arrernte.

⟨mx⟩ is used in Nambikwara for a glottalized /ˀm/.

== N ==
⟨nʼ⟩ is used in Xhosa and Shona for /ŋ/. Since ⟨ʼ⟩ is not a letter in either language, ⟨nʼ⟩ is not technically a digraph.

⟨nb⟩ is used for /mb/ in Chinese languages such as Nuosu. It is also used in Fula in Guinea for /ᵐb/ (written as ⟨mb⟩ in other countries).

⟨nc⟩ is used in various alphabets. In the Romanized Popular Alphabet used to write Hmong, it represents /ɲɟ/. In Tharaka it is /ntʃ/. In Xhosa and Zulu it represents the click /ᵑǀ/.

⟨nd⟩ (capital ⟨Nd⟩) is used in many African languages to represent /nd/ or /ⁿd/. In Standard Zhuang and Bouyei, it represents /ɗ/. ⟨nd⟩ (capital ⟨nD⟩) is used word initially in Irish, as the eclipsis of ⟨d⟩, to represent /n̪ˠ/ (beside ⟨a, o, u⟩) and /n̠ʲ/ (beside ⟨e, i⟩), e.g. ár ndoras /aːɾˠ ˈn̪ˠɔɾˠəsˠ/ "our door" (cf. doras /ˈd̪ˠɔɾˠəsˠ/ "door"), i nDoire "in Derry".

⟨nf⟩, equivalent to ⟨mf⟩ for /mf/ or /ᵐf/. In Rangi ⟨nf⟩ is /ᵐf/ while ⟨mf⟩ is /m.f/.

⟨ng⟩ is used in English and several other languages to represent the velar nasal /ŋ/. It is considered a single letter in many Austronesian languages (Māori, Tagalog, Tongan, Gilbertese, Tuvaluan, Indonesian, Chamorro), Welsh, and Rheinische Dokumenta, for velar nasal /ŋ/; and in some African languages (Lingala, Bambara, Wolof) for prenasalized /ɡ/ (/ⁿɡ/).

For the development of the pronunciation of this digraph in English, see NG-coalescence and G-dropping.

Finnish uses ⟨ng⟩ to represent the phonemically long velar nasal /ŋː/ in contrast to ⟨nk⟩ /ŋk/, which is its "strong" form under consonant gradation, a type of lenition. Weakening /k/ produces an archiphonemic "velar fricative", which, as a velar fricative does not exist in Standard Finnish, is assimilated to the preceding /ŋ/, producing /ŋː/. (No /ɡ/ is involved at any point, despite the spelling ⟨ng⟩). The digraph ⟨ng⟩ is not an independent letter, but it is an exception to the phonemic principle, one of the few in standard Finnish.

⟨ng⟩ (capital ⟨nG⟩) is used word-initially in Irish, as the eclipsis of ⟨g⟩, to represent /ŋ/ (beside ⟨a, o, u⟩) or /ɲ/ (beside ⟨e, i⟩), e.g. ár ngalar /aːɾˠ ˈŋalˠəɾˠ/ "our illness" (cf. /ˈɡalˠəɾˠ/), i nGaillimh "in Galway".

In Tagalog and other Philippine languages, ⟨ng⟩ represented the prenasalized sequence /ŋɡ/ during the Spanish era. The velar nasal, /ŋ/, was written in a variety of ways, namely "n͠g", "ñg", "gñ" (as in Sagñay), and—after a vowel—at times "g̃". During the standardization of Tagalog in the early part of the 20th century, ⟨ng⟩ became used for the velar nasal /ŋ/, while prenasalized /ŋɡ/ came to be written ⟨ngg⟩. Furthermore, ⟨ng⟩ is also used for a common genitive particle pronounced /naŋ/, to differentiate it from an adverbial particle nang.

In Uzbek, it is considered as a separate letter, being the last (twenty-ninth) letter of the Uzbek alphabet. It is followed by the apostrophe (tutuq belgisi).

Its alphabetical position is either 8 (after G) or 17 (after N).

⟨ńg⟩ is used in Central Alaskan Yup'ik to write the voiceless nasal /ŋ̊/.

⟨ñg⟩, or more precisely ⟨n͠g⟩, was a digraph in several Spanish-derived orthographies of the Pacific, such as Tagalog and Chamorro, where it represented /ŋ/, as opposed to ⟨ng⟩, which originally represented /ŋɡ/. An example is Chamorro agan͠gñáijon (modern agangñaihon) "to declare". Besides ⟨ñg⟩, variants of ⟨n͠g⟩ include ⟨gñ⟩ (as in Sagñay), ⟨ng̃⟩, and a ⟨g̃⟩, that is preceded by a vowel (but not a consonant). It has since been replaced by the trigraph ⟨ngg⟩ or ⟨ng⟩ (see above).

⟨ngʼ⟩ is used for /ŋ/ in Swahili and languages with Swahili-based orthographies. Since ⟨ʼ⟩ is not a letter in Swahili, ⟨ngʼ⟩ is technically a digraph, not a trigraph.

⟨nh⟩ is used in several languages. See article.

⟨ni⟩ in Polish, it usually represents ɲ whenever it precedes a vowel, and ɲi whenever it precedes a consonant (or in the end of the word), and is considered a graphic variant of ń appearing in other situations. (In some cases it may represent also ɲj before a vowel; for a better description, when, see the relevant section in the article on Polish orthography).

⟨nj⟩ is a letter in the Latin orthographies of Albanian, Slovene and Serbo-Croatian. Ljudevit Gaj, a Croat, first used this digraph in 1830. In all of these languages, it represents the palatal nasal /ɲ/. For example, the Croatian and Serbian word konj "horse" is pronounced /koɲ/. The digraph was created in the 19th century by analogy with a digraph of Cyrillic, which developed into the ligature ⟨њ⟩. While there are dedicated Unicode codepoints, U+01CA (Ǌ), U+01CB (ǋ) and U+01CC (ǌ), these are included for backwards compatibility (with legacy encodings for Serbo-Croatian which kept a one-to-one correspondence with Cyrillic Њњ) and modern texts use a sequence of Basic Latin characters.

In Faroese, it generally represents /ɲ/, although in some words it represent /nj/, like in banjo. It is also used in some languages of Africa and Oceania where it represents a prenazalized voiced postalveolar affricate or fricative, /ⁿdʒ/ or /ⁿʒ/. In Malagasy, it represents /ⁿdz/.

Other letters and digraphs of the Latin alphabet used for spelling this sound are ⟨ń⟩ (in Polish), ⟨ň⟩ (in Czech and Slovak), ⟨ñ⟩ (in Spanish), ⟨nh⟩ (in Portuguese and Occitan), ⟨gn⟩ (in Italian and French), and ⟨ny⟩ (in Hungarian, among others).

⟨nk⟩ is used in many Bantu languages like Lingala, Tshiluba, and Kikongo, for /ŋk/ or /ᵑk/. In the transcription of Australian Aboriginal languages such as Warlpiri, Arrernte, and Pitjantjatjara, it distinguishes a prenasalized velar stop, /ŋ͡k ~ ŋ͡ɡ/, from the nasal /ŋ/.

⟨nm⟩ is used in Yélî Dnye for doubly articulated /n͡m/.

⟨ńm⟩ is used in Yélî Dnye for doubly articulated /n̪͡m/.

⟨nn⟩ is used in Irish to represent the fortis nasals /n̪ˠ/ (beside ⟨a, o, u⟩) and /n̠ʲ/ (beside ⟨e, i⟩). It is used in Scottish Gaelic to represent /n̪ˠ/ beside ⟨a, o, u⟩ and /ɲ/ beside ⟨e, i⟩. In Spanish historical ⟨nn⟩ has contracted to the ligature ⟨ñ⟩ and represents /ɲ/. In the Gwoyeu Romatzyh romanization of Mandarin Chinese, final -nn indicates a falling tone on a syllable ending in /n/, which is otherwise spelled -n. It is used in Haida (Bringhurst orthography) for glottalized /ˀn/. In Piedmontese, it is /ŋn/ in the middle of a word, and /n/ at the end. In Cornish, it is used for an optionally pre-occluded /n/; that is, it is pronounced either /n/ or /nː/ (in any position); /ᵈn/ (before a consonant or finally); or /dn/ (before a vowel); examples are penn ('head') or pennow ('heads').

⟨np⟩ is used in the Romanized Popular Alphabet used to write Hmong, where it represents /mb/.

⟨nq⟩ is used in various alphabets. In the Romanized Popular Alphabet used to write Hmong, it represents /ɴɢ/.

In Xhosa and Zulu it represents the click /ᵑǃ/.
In the Gwoyeu Romatzyh romanization of Mandarin Chinese, final -nq indicates a falling tone on a syllable ending in /ŋ/, which is otherwise spelled -ng.

⟨nr⟩ is used in the Romanized Popular Alphabet used to write Hmong, where it represents /ɳɖ/. In the General Alphabet of Cameroon Languages it is /ɳ /.

⟨ns⟩, in many African languages, represents /ns/ or /ⁿs/.

⟨nt⟩ is a letter present in many African languages where it represents /nt/ or /ⁿt/. Modern Greek uses the equivalent digraph ντ for /d/, as δ is used for /ð/.

⟨nv⟩, equivalent to ⟨mv⟩ for /mv/ or /ᵐv/.

⟨nw⟩ is used in Igbo for /ŋʷ/, and in Arrernte for /nʷ/.

⟨nx⟩ is used for the click /ᵑǁ/ in Xhosa and Zulu, and in Nambikwara for a glottalized /ˀn/.

⟨ny⟩ is used in several languages for /ɲ/. See article.

⟨nz⟩, in many African languages, represents /nz/ ~ /ⁿz/, /ndz/ ~ /ⁿdz/, /nʒ/ ~ /ⁿʒ/, or /ndʒ/ ~ /ⁿdʒ/.

⟨nǃ⟩ is used in Juǀʼhoan for the alveolar nasal click /ᵑǃ/.

⟨nǀ⟩ is used in Juǀʼhoan for the dental nasal click /ᵑǀ/.

⟨nǁ⟩ is used in Juǀʼhoan for the lateral nasal click /ᵑǁ/.

⟨nǂ⟩ is used in Juǀʼhoan for the palatal nasal click /ᵑǂ/.

⟨n-⟩ is used for medial /ŋ/ in Piedmontese.

== O ==
⟨o′⟩ is used for /o/ and /ø/ in Uzbek, with the preferred typographical form being ⟨oʻ⟩ (Cyrillic ⟨ў⟩). Technically it is not a digraph in Uzbek, since ⟨ʻ⟩ is not a letter of the Uzbek alphabet, but rather a typographic convention for a diacritic. In handwriting the letter is written as ⟨õ⟩.

It is also used in Taa, for the glottalized or creaky vowel /o̰/.

⟨oa⟩ is used in English, where it commonly represents /oʊ/ as in road, coal, boast, coaxing, etc. In Middle English, where the digraph originated, it represented /ɔː/, a pronunciation retained in the word broad and derivatives, and when the digraph is followed by an "r", as in soar and bezoar. The letters also represent two vowels, as in koala /oʊ.ɑː/, boa /oʊ.ə/, coaxial /oʊ.æ/, oasis /oʊ.eɪ/, and doable /uː.ə/.

In Malagasy, it is occasionally used for /o/.

⟨oe⟩ is found in many languages. In English, it represents /oʊ/ as in hoe and sometimes /uː/ as in shoe. It may also represent /ɛ/ in AmE pronunciation of Oedipus, (o)esophagus (also in BrE), and (o)estrogen, /eɪ/ in boehmite (AmE) and surnames like Boehner and Groening (as if spelled Bayner and Gray/Greyning respectively), and /iː/ in foetus (BrE and CoE) and some speakers' pronunciation of Oedipus and oestrogen.

It represents /u/ in Afrikaans and Dutch, e.g. doen; it also represented the same phoneme in the Indonesian language before the 1972 spelling reform.
In French, it is ligatured to ⟨œ⟩ and stands for the vowels /œ/ (as in œil /œj/) and /e/ (as in œsophage /ezɔfaʒ ~ øzɔfaʒ/). Unligatured ⟨oe⟩ is used in the word moelle, where it represents /wa/.
It is an alternative way to write ⟨ö⟩ or ⟨ø⟩ in German or Scandinavian languages when this character is unavailable.
In romanization of Wu Chinese and in Royal Thai General System of Transcription, it represents /ɤ/.
In the ILE romanization of Cantonese it represents the vowel /ɵ ~ œː/, while in the Jyutping romanisation of Cantonese it represents /œː/.
In Zhuang it is used for /o/ (⟨o⟩ is used for /oː/).
In Piedmontese, it is /wɛ/.
In the Kernewek Kemmyn orthography of Cornish, it is used for a phoneme which is [oː] long, [oˑ] mid-length, and [ɤ] short.

⟨oê⟩ is used in French to write /wa/ in a few words before what had historically been an ⟨s⟩, mostly in words derived from poêle /pwal/ "stove". The diacriticless variant, ⟨oe⟩, rarely represents this sound except in words related to moelle /mwal/ (rarely spelt moëlle).

⟨ôe⟩ is used in Afrikaans for the vowel /ɔː/.

⟨õe⟩ is used in Portuguese for /õĩ̯/. It is used in plural forms of some words ended in ⟨ão⟩, such as anão–anões and campeão–campeões.

⟨oh⟩ is used in Taa, for the breathy or murmured vowel /o̤/.

⟨oi⟩ is used in various languages. In English, it represents /ɔɪ/ as in coin and join.

In French, it represents /wa/, which was historically – and still is in some cases – written ⟨oy⟩.
In Irish it is used for /ɛ/, /ɔ/, /ɪ/, /əi̯/, /iː/, /oː/ between a broad and a slender consonant.
In Scottish Gaelic it is used for /ɔ/, /ɤ/, except before ⟨ll, m, nn⟩ word-finally or pre-consonant, where it is /əi/.
In Piedmontese, it is /ui̯/.

⟨oí⟩ is used in Irish for /iː/ between a broad and a slender consonant.

⟨oî⟩ is used in French to write /wa/ before what had historically been an ⟨s⟩, as in boîtier or cloître.

⟨ói⟩ is used in Irish for /oː/ between a broad and a slender consonant. It is also used in Portuguese.

⟨òi⟩ is used in Piedmontese for /oi̯/. It is used in Scottish Gaelic for /oː/ or /ɔː/

⟨om⟩ is used in Portuguese for /õ/, and in French to write /ɔ̃/.

⟨ôm⟩ is used in Brazilian Portuguese for /õ/ before a consonant.

⟨on⟩ is used in Portuguese for /õ/ before a consonant, and in French to write /ɔ̃/.

⟨ôn⟩ is used in Portuguese for /õ/ before a consonant.

⟨ön⟩ is used in Tibetan Pinyin for /ø̃/. It is alternately written oin.

⟨oo⟩ is used in many languages. In English, it generally represents sounds which historically descend from the Middle English pronunciation /oː/. After the Great Vowel Shift, this came to typically represent /uː/ as in "moon" and "food". Subsequently, in a handful of common words like "good" and "flood" the vowel was shortened to /u/, and after the FOOT–STRUT split, these became /ʊ/ and /ʌ/ respectively.

Like in Middle English, the digraph's pronunciation is /oː/ in most other languages, e.g. German and Dutch.
In Cornish, it represents either /oː/ or /uː/.
In Tâi-lô orthography for Taiwanese Hokkien, it represents /ɔ/.

⟨oq⟩ is used in Taa, for the pharyngealized vowel /oˤ/.

⟨or⟩, in Daighi tongiong pingim, represents mid central vowel /ə/ or close-mid back rounded vowel /o/ in Taiwanese Hokkien.

⟨ou⟩ is used in English for the diphthong /aʊ/, as in out /aʊt/. This spelling is generally used before consonants, with ⟨ow⟩ being used instead before vowels and at the ends of words. Occasionally ⟨ou⟩ may also represent other vowels – /ʌ/ as in trouble, /oʊ/ as in soul, /ʊ/ as in would, /uː/ as in group, or /juː/ as in the alternate American pronunciation of coupon. The ⟨ou⟩ in out originally represented /uː/, as in French, and its pronunciation has mostly changed as part of the Great Vowel Shift. However, the /uː/ sound remains before ⟨p⟩.

In Dutch ⟨ou⟩ represents /ʌu/ in the Netherlands or /ɔu/ in Flanders.
In Cornish, it represents [uː], [u], or [ʊ].
In French, it represents the vowel /u/, as in vous /vu/ "you", or the approximant consonant /w/, as in oui /wi/ "yes".
In Portuguese it stands for the close-mid back rounded vowel /o/ or for the falling diphthong /ou/, according to dialect.
It is used In Hepburn romanization of the Japanese language for /oː/.

⟨oû⟩ is used in French to write /u/ before what had historically been an ⟨s⟩, as in soûl /su/ "drunk" (also spelt soul).

⟨ow⟩ in used in English to primarily represent /aʊ/ as in coward, sundowner, and now or /oʊ/, as in froward, landowner, and know. An exceptional pronunciation is /ɒ/ in knowledge and rowlock. There are many English heteronyms distinguished only by the pronunciation of this digraph, like: bow (front of ship or weapon), bower (a dwelling or string player), lower (to frown or drop), mow (to grimace or cut), row (a dispute or line-up), shower (rain or presenter), sow (a pig or to seed), tower (a building or towboat).

In Cornish, this represents the diphthong /ɔʊ/ or /oʊ/; before vowels, it can also represent /uː/.

⟨ôw⟩ is used in the Kernowek Standard orthography of Cornish to represent either /ɛʊ/ or /oʊ/. This distribution can also be written ⟨êw⟩.

⟨oy⟩ is found in many languages. In English it represents /ɔɪ/, e.g. toy and annoy.

In Faroese, it also represents /ɔɪ/.
In Cornish, it represents the diphthong /oɪ/~/ɔɪ/; in the words oy ('egg') and moy ('much'), it can also be pronounced /uɪ/~/ʊɪ/.

⟨oŷ⟩ is an obsolete digraph once used in French.

⟨øy⟩ is used in Norwegian for /øʏ/.

⟨o_e⟩ (a split digraph) indicates an English 'long o', historically /ɔː/ which evolved into /oʊ/.

== P ==
⟨p'⟩ is used in Nuxalk for /pʼ/.

⟨pf⟩ is used in English for /f/ in German loanwords, e.g. Pfizer.

In German, it is used for the affricate /pf/, e.g. Pferd "horse", Apfel "apple", and Knopf "button".

⟨ph⟩ in used in English and French for /f/, mostly in words derived from Greek, but also some words derived from Vietnamese.

In Irish, Scottish Gaelic and Welsh it represents the lenition/aspiration of ⟨p⟩.
It represents /f/ in Vietnamese, where ⟨f⟩ is not used.

⟨pl⟩ is used in the Romanized Popular Alphabet used to write Hmong, for /pˡ/.

⟨pm⟩ is used for /ᵖm/ in Arrernte.

⟨pn⟩ is used in English for /n/ initially in words of Greek origin such as pneumatic.

⟨pp⟩ is used in romanized Korean for the fortis sound /p͈/, and in Cypriot Arabic for /pʰː/. It was used in Portuguese until 1947, e.g. guardanappo, appa and mappelido.

⟨ps⟩ is used in English and Portuguese for /s/ initially in words of Greek origin such as psyche (English) and Psychòtico (Portuguese).

In Shona it represents a whistled sibilant cluster /ps͎/.

⟨pt⟩ is used in several languages for /t/ in words of Greek origin, where it was /pt/, e.g. in English pterosaur /ˈtɛrəsɔːr/.

⟨pw⟩ is used in Arrernte for /pʷ/.

⟨py⟩ is used in Cypriot Arabic for /pc/.

== Q ==
⟨q'⟩ is used in Nuxalk for /qʼ/.

⟨qg⟩ is used in Naro for the click /ǃχ/. It was used in the Tindall orthography of Khoekhoe for the voiceless alveolar click /ǃ/.

⟨qh⟩ is used in various alphabets. In Quechua and the Romanized Popular Alphabet used to write Hmong, it represents /qʰ/. In Xhosa, it represents the click /ǃʰ/.

⟨qk⟩ was used in the Tindall orthography of Khoekhoe for the voiceless alveolar click /ǃ/ (equivalent to ⟨qg⟩).

⟨qq⟩ is used in Haida (Bringhurst orthography) for ejective /qʼ/. In Hadza it represents the glottalized click /ᵑǃˀ/.

⟨qu⟩ is used in Aragonese, Asturian, Catalan, French, Galician, Mirandese, Occitan, Portuguese and Spanish for /k/ before ⟨e, i⟩, where ⟨c⟩ represents /θ/ (Castilian Spanish, Asturian, Aragonese and most of Galicia) or /s/ (Catalan, French, American Spanish, Occitan and Portuguese). In French, ⟨qu⟩ is also usually /k/ before ⟨a, o⟩. In English, it represents /k/ in words derived from those languages (e.g., quiche), and /kw/ in other words, including borrowings from Latin (e.g., quantity).

In German, it represents /kv/.
In the Ossetian Latin alphabet, it was used for /qʷ/.
In Vietnamese it is used to represent /kw/ or /w/.
In Cornish, it represents /kw/.

⟨qü⟩ is used in Catalan and formerly Portuguese for /kw/ before ⟨e, i⟩.

⟨qv⟩ is used in Bouyei for /ˀw/.

⟨qw⟩ is used in some languages for /qʷ/. In Mi'kmaq it represents /xʷ/.

In the Kernowek Standard and Standard Written Form orthographies for Revived Cornish, it represents /kw/.

⟨qy⟩ is used in Bouyei for glottalized /ˀj/.

== R ==
⟨rd⟩ is used in the transcription of Australian Aboriginal languages such as Warlpiri, Arrernte, and Pitjantjatjara for a retroflex stop, /ʈ/.

In Norwegian and Swedish it represents a voiced retroflex plosive, [ɖ].
In Scottish Gaelic it sometimes represents /rˠʃt̪/ when broad, or /rˠʃtʲ/ when slender, though this epenthetic consonant is not found in all dialects.

⟨rh⟩ is used in English for Greek words transliterated through Latin, e.g. rhapsody, rhetoric, and rhythm. These were pronounced in Ancient Greek with a voiceless "r" sound, /r̥/, as in Old English ⟨hr⟩. The digraph may also be found within words, but always at the start of a word component, e.g., "polyrhythmic". German, French, and Interlingua use ⟨rh⟩ in the same way.

In Welsh, it represents a voiceless alveolar trill (r̥), that is a voiceless "r" sound. It can be found anywhere; the most common occurrence in English from Welsh is in the slightly respelled given name "Rhonda".
In Wade-Giles transliteration, ⟨rh⟩ is used for the syllable-final rhotic of Mandarin Chinese.
In the Gwoyeu Romatzyh romanization of Mandarin Chinese, initial ⟨rh⟩- indicates an even tone on a syllable beginning in /ʐ/, which is otherwise spelled ⟨r⟩-.
In Purépecha, it is a retroflex flap, /ɽ/.

⟨rl⟩ is used in the transcription of Australian Aboriginal languages such as Warlpiri, Arrernte, and Pitjantjatjara, as well in Norwegian and Swedish, for a retroflex lateral /ɭ/.

In Greenlandic, it represents /ɬː/ as the result of an assimilation of a consonant cluster with a uvular consonant as the first component.

⟨rm⟩ is used in Inuktitut for /ɴm/.

⟨rn⟩ represents the retroflex nasal /ɳ/ in Warlpiri, Arrernte, and Pitjantjatjara (see transcription of Australian Aboriginal languages), as well in Norwegian and Swedish.

In Greenlandic, it represents /ɴ/.

⟨rp⟩ is used in Greenlandic for /pː/ as the result of an assimilation of a consonant cluster with a uvular consonant as the first component.

⟨rr⟩ is used in English for /r/. In several European languages, such as Catalan, Spanish, Portuguese, Basque or Albanian, ⟨rr⟩ represents the alveolar trill /r/ (or the voiced uvular fricative /ʁ/ in Portuguese) and contrasts with the single ⟨r⟩, which represents the alveolar tap /ɾ/ (in Catalan and Spanish a single ⟨r⟩ also represents the alveolar trill at the beginning of words or syllables).

In Italian and Finnish, it is a geminated (long) consonant /rː/.
In Central Alaskan Yup'ik it is used for /χ/.
In Cornish, it can represent either /rː/, /ɾʰ/, or /ɹ/.
In Scottish Gaelic, it represents /rˠ/.

⟨rs⟩ was equivalent to ⟨rz⟩ and stood for /r̝/ (modern ř) in medieval Czech.

In Greenlandic, it represents /sː/ as the result of an assimilation of a consonant cluster with a uvular consonant as the first component.
In Norwegian and Swedish, it represents the voiceless retroflex fricative, [ʂ].

⟨rt⟩ is used in Australian Aboriginal languages such as Warlpiri, Arrernte, and Pitjantjatjara, as well in Norwegian and Swedish, for a retroflex stop /ʈ/.

In Scottish Gaelic it often represents /rˠʃt̪/ when broad, or /rˠʃtʲ/ when slender, though this epenthetic consonant is not found in all dialects.

⟨rw⟩ is used for /ɻʷ/ in Arrernte.

⟨rz⟩ is used in Polish and Kashubian for a voiced retroflex fricative /ʐ/, similar to English ⟨zh⟩ as in Zhivago. Examples from Polish are marzec /ˈma.ʐɛt͡s/ "March" and rzeka /ˈʐɛ.ka/ "river". ⟨rz⟩ represents the same sound as ⟨ż⟩, but they have a different origin. ⟨rz⟩ used to be pronounced the same way as Czech ⟨ř⟩ (/r̝/) in older Polish, but the sounds merged, and the orthography still follows etymology. When preceded by a voiceless consonant (⟨ch, k, p, t⟩) or end of a word, ⟨rz⟩ devoices to [ʂ], as in przed /ˈpʂɛt/ "before".

== S ==
⟨sc⟩ is used in Italian for /ʃː/ before the front vowel letters ⟨e, i⟩. It is used for /s/ in Catalan, Latin American Spanish, French, English, Occitan and Brazilian Portuguese (e.g. French/English reminiscence, Spanish reminiscencia, Brazilian Portuguese reminiscência, Catalan reminiscència, Occitan reminiscéncia); in European Portuguese this changed to /ʃ/ in the early 20th century, although in careful speech it can be /ʃs/. However, it represents /z/ in modern pronunciations of crescent in British and non-Canadian Commonwealth English. In Old English it usually represented /ʃ/.

⟨sç⟩ is used in French for /s/ in a few verb forms such as simple past acquiesça /akjɛsa/. It is also used in Portuguese as in the imperative/conjunctive form of verbs ending with ⟨scer⟩: crescer cresça. Still pronounced /s/ in Brazilian Portuguese, in European Portuguese this changed to /ʃ/ in the early 20th century, although in careful speech it can be /ʃs/.

⟨sg⟩ is used in Piedmontese and Corsican for /ʒ/.

⟨sh⟩ is used in several languages. In English, it represents /ʃ/. See separate article. See also ⟨ſh⟩ below, which has the capitalized forms SH and ŞH.

⟨si⟩ is used in English for /ʒ/ in words such as fusion (see yod-coalescence).

In Polish, it represents /ɕ/ whenever it precedes a vowel, and /ɕi/ whenever it precedes a consonant (or at the end of the word), and is considered a graphic variant of ⟨ś⟩ appearing in other situations.
In Welsh ⟨si⟩ is used for /ʃ/ as in siocled /ʃɔklɛd/ ('chocolate').

⟨sj⟩ is used Swedish to write the sje sound /ɧ/ (see also ⟨sk⟩) and in Faroese, Danish, Norwegian and Dutch to write the voiceless postalveolar fricative /ʃ/.

⟨sk⟩ is used in Swedish to write the sje sound /ɧ/. It takes by rule this sound value before the front vowels (⟨e, i, y, ä, ö⟩) word or root initially (as in sked (spoon)), while normally representing /sk/ in other positions. In Norwegian and Faroese, it is used to write the voiceless postalveolar fricative /ʃ/ (only in front of ⟨i, y, ei, øy/oy⟩).

⟨sl⟩ is used in Iraqw and Bouyei to write the lateral fricative /ɬ/. (⟨sl⟩ is used in the French tradition to transcribe /ɬ/ in other languages as well, as in the General Alphabet of Cameroon Languages.)

⟨sp⟩ is used in German for /ʃp/ as in Spaß /ʃpaːs/ instead of using ⟨schp⟩.

⟨sr⟩ is used in Kosraean for /ʂ/. In northern dialects of Scottish Gaelic it represents /s̪t̪ɾ/, as in sràid /s̪t̪ɾaːtʲ/.

⟨ss⟩ is used in English for used for /s/. Though, it typically represents /z/ in the first ⟨ss⟩ of possess (and derivatives possessed, possesses, possession, possessive and possessor), brassiere, dessert, dissolution (and derivatives dissolved, dissolves and dissolving), Missoula, Missouri(an), scissors, and pronunciations of Aussie outside of America.

In other languages, such as Catalan, Cornish, French, German, Italian, Occitan, Portuguese and Central Alaskan Yup'ik, where ⟨s⟩ represents /z/ between vowels (and elsewhere in the case of Yup'ik), ⟨ss⟩ is used for /s/ in that position (/sː/ in Italian and also in some cases in Cornish); English sometimes also follows this convention.
It is used for /z/ in Chinese languages such as Nuosu.
For its use in the Wade–Giles system of Romanization of Chinese, see Wade–Giles → Syllabic consonants.
In romanized Korean, it represents the fortis sound /s͈/.
In Cypriot Arabic it is used for /sʰː/.

⟨st⟩ is used in German for /ʃt/ as in Stadt /ʃtat/ instead of using ⟨scht⟩ (or ⟨cht⟩). In some parts of northern Germany, the pronunciation /st/ (as in English) is still quite common in the local dialect.

⟨sv⟩ is used in Shona to write the whistled sibilant /s͎/. This was written ⟨ȿ⟩ from 1931 to 1955.

⟨sx⟩ is used in Nambikwara for a glottalized /sʔ/, and in Esperanto orthography it is an unofficial surrogate of ⟨ŝ⟩, that represents /ʃ/.

⟨sy⟩ represents /ʃ/ in Malay and Tagalog.

⟨sz⟩ is used in several languages. See article.

== T ==
⟨t'⟩ is used in Nuxalk for /tʼ/.

⟨tc⟩ is used for the palatal click /ǂ/ in Naro, and to write the affricate /tʃ/ in Sandawe, Hadza and Juǀʼhoan.

⟨tf⟩ is used in the General Alphabet of Cameroon Languages for the voiceless dental affricate /t͡θ/

⟨tg⟩ is used for /tχ/ in Naro. In Catalan, it represents /d͡ʒ/. In Romansh orthographies it represents the Alveolo-palatal consonant /tɕ/.

⟨th⟩ is used in several languages. In English, it can represent /ð/, /θ/ or /t/. See article. See also: Pronunciation of English th.

⟨ti⟩, before a vowel, is usually pronounced /sj/ in French and /tsj/ in German and is commonly /ʃ/ in English, especially in the suffix -tion.

⟨tj⟩ is used in Norwegian and Faroese words like tjære/tjøra ('tar') for /ç/ (Norwegian) and /tʃ/ (Faroese). In the closely related Swedish alphabet, it represents /ɕ/, as in tjära /ˈɕæːɾa/. It is also the standard written form of /tʃ/ in Dutch and was likewise used in Dutch-based orthographies that used to apply for languages in Indonesia and Surinam.

In the transcription of Australian Aboriginal languages such as Warlpiri, Arrernte, and Pitjantjatjara, it represents a postalveolar stop, transcribed in the International Phonetic Alphabet as /ṯ/ or /ḏ/ depending on voicing. This sound is also written ⟨dj⟩, ⟨ty⟩, ⟨dy⟩, ⟨c⟩, or ⟨j⟩.
In Catalan it represents /d͡ʒ/.
In Juǀʼhoan it is used for the ejective affricate /tʃʼ/.

⟨tk⟩ is used in Juǀʼhoan for the uvularized ejective /tᵡʼ/.

⟨tl⟩ is used in various orthographies for the voiceless alveolar lateral affricate /tɬ/.

In Catalan it represents /lː/, although it may be simplify to /l/ in some dialects.

⟨tł⟩ is used in the transcription of Athabascan languages for a lateral affricate /tɬ/ or /tɬʰ/.

⟨tm⟩ is used in Yélî Dnye for doubly articulated and nasally released /t̪͡pn̪͡m/.

In Catalan, it is used to represent /mː/, that can result not geminated as well, /m/, as in setmana (pronounced /səˈmːanə/ in standard Catalan and /seˈmana/ in Valencian).

⟨tn⟩ is used for a prestopped nasal /ᵗn/ in Arrernte, and for the similar /t̪n̪/ in Yélî Dnye.

In Catalan it represents /nː/, although it may be simplify to /n/ in some dialects.

⟨tp⟩ is used in Yélî Dnye for doubly articulated /t̪͡p/.

⟨tr⟩ generally represents a sound like a retroflex version of English "ch" in areas of German influence, such as Truk lagoon, now spelled ⟨chuuk⟩. For instance, in Malagasy it represents /tʂ/. In southern dialects of Vietnamese, ⟨tr⟩ represents a voiceless retroflex affricate /tʂ/. In the northern dialects, this sound is pronounced /tɕ/, just like what ⟨ch⟩ represents. ⟨tr⟩ was formerly considered a distinct letter of the Vietnamese alphabet, but today is not.

⟨ts⟩ is used for /t͡s/ in many languages, e.g. Catalan and central-western Asturian. It is used in English to represent /s/ or /z/ word-initially in loanwords from these languages, e.g. tsunami and tsar.

In Basque, it represents an apical voiceless alveolar affricate /t̺s̺/. It contrasts with ⟨tz⟩, which is laminal /t̻s̻/.
It is also used to Latinize the letter Tse (Cyrillic) (ц).
In Hausa (Boko alphabet), ⟨ts⟩ represents an alveolar ejective fricative /sʼ/ or affricate /tsʼ/), depending on dialect. It is considered a distinct letter, and placed between ⟨t⟩ and ⟨u⟩ in alphabetical order.
For most of the Philippine languages, it is used for /t͡ʃ/ as an alternative spelling of ⟨ch⟩.
The Wade-Giles and Yale romanizations of Chinese use ⟨ts⟩ for an unaspirated voiceless alveolar affricate /ts/. Wade–Giles also uses ⟨ts'⟩ for the aspirated equivalent /tsʰ/. These are equivalent to Hanyu Pinyin ⟨z⟩ and ⟨c⟩, respectively.
The Hepburn romanization of Japanese uses ⟨ts⟩ for a voiceless alveolar affricate /ts/). In native Japanese words, this sound only occurs before ⟨u⟩, but it may occur before other vowels in loanwords. Other romanization systems write /tsu/ as ⟨tu⟩
In Tagalog, it is used for /tʃ/.

⟨ts̃⟩ was used in medieval Basque and in Azkue's Basque dictionary for a voiceless postalveolar affricate /t͡ʃ/; this is now represented by ⟨tx⟩.

⟨tt⟩ is used in Basque for /c/, and in romanized Kabyle for /ts/. In romanized Korean, it represents the fortis sound /t͈/, in Haida (Bringhurst orthography) it is ejective /tʼ/, and in Cypriot Arabic, it represents /tʰː/.

⟨tw⟩ is used for /tʷ/ in Arrernte.

⟨tx⟩ is used in Basque, Catalan and some indigenous languages of South America, for a voiceless postalveolar affricate /t͡ʃ/.

In Nambikwara it represents a glottalized /tʔ/.
In Juǀʼhoan it is used for the uvularized-release /tᵡ/.

⟨ty⟩ is used in the Hungarian alphabet for /c/, a voiceless palatal plosive; in Hungarian, digraphs are considered single letters, and acronyms keep them intact.

In Xhosa, ⟨ty⟩ represents /tʲʼ/ and the similar /tʲʼ/ in the Algonquian Massachusett orthography.
In Shona, it represents /tʃk/.
In Tagalog it represents /tʃ/.
In the transcription of Australian Aboriginal languages such as Warlpiri, and Arrernte, it represents a postalveolar stop, either voiceless /ṯ/ or voiced /ḏ/. (This sound is also written ⟨tj⟩, ⟨dj⟩, ⟨dy⟩, ⟨c⟩, and ⟨j⟩).
In Cypriot Arabic, it represents /c/.

⟨tz⟩ is used in Basque, German and Nahuatl for the voiceless alveolar affricate /t͡s/. In Basque, this sound is laminal and contrasts with the apical affricate represented by ⟨ts⟩.

It is also used in Catalan to represent the voiced alveolar affricate /d͡z/.
In Juǀʼhoan it is used for the ejective affricate /tsʼ/.
For its use in the Wade–Giles system of Romanization of Chinese, see Wade–Giles → Syllabic consonants.

== U ==
⟨u′⟩ is used in Taa for the glottalized or creaky vowel /ṵ/.

⟨ua⟩ is used in Irish, Scottish Gaelic, and the Romanized Popular Alphabet used to write Hmong, to represent the diphthong /uə/.

⟨uc⟩ is used in Nahuatl for /kʷ/ before a consonant. Before a vowel, ⟨cu⟩ is used.

⟨ue⟩ is found in many languages. In English, it represents /juː/ or /uː/ as in cue or true, respectively.

In German, it is /ʏ/ or /yː/ (equivalent to ⟨ü⟩), appearing mainly in proper nouns.
In Cantonese Romanisation, it represents /yː/ in a non-initial position.

⟨ûe⟩ is used in Afrikaans to represent /œː/.

⟨ug⟩ is used in Central Alaskan Yup'ik for /ɣʷ/.

⟨uh⟩ is used in Taa for the breathy or murmured vowel /ṳ/. In Nahuatl, it is used for /w/ before a consonant. Before a vowel, ⟨hu⟩ is used.

⟨ui⟩ is sometimes acts as a digraph in English. It represents /uː/ in fruit, juice, suit and pursuit. However, after ⟨g⟩, the ⟨u⟩ functions as a modifier (marking ⟨g⟩ as /ɡ/ rather than /dʒ/), e.g. guild, guilty, sanguine, Guinea, guide etc.), it is also used for other sounds, in cases of unusual etymological spelling, e.g. circuit, biscuit, build.

In Scots, it represents /ø/, e.g. bluid "blood", duin "done", muin "moon" and spuin "spoon".
In Dutch, it represents the diphthong /œy/.
Irish, it is /ɪ/ after a broad (velarized) consonant.
In Scottish Gaelic it normally represents /u/, however before ⟨m, n, ng, s⟩ or before ⟨ll, m, nn⟩ preceding a vowel, it represents /ɯ/, and before ⟨dh⟩ or before ⟨ll, m, nn⟩ word-finally or pre-consonant, it represents /ɯi/.
In German, it represents the diphthong /ʊɪ̯/, which appears only in interjections such as 'pfui!'.
In Hanyu Pinyin, it is used for /wei̯/ after a consonant (spelt ⟨wei⟩ in the initial position).
In Cantonese Romanisation, it represents /uːy/ or /ɵy/.
In Portuguese, it represents the diphthong /ui̯/, as in intuito "intention" or cuidar "to care", but in a very small selective group of words that come from Latin multus "much", it represents a nasalized /ũĩ̯/, as in muito "very" or "much".

⟨ũi⟩ was used in old Portuguese for /ũĩ̯/, which in some dialects gets reduced to /ũː/.

⟨uĩ⟩ was used in old Portuguese for /wĩː/.

⟨uí⟩ is used in Irish for /iː/ between a broad and a slender consonant.

⟨úi⟩ is used in Irish for /uː/ between a broad and a slender consonant.

⟨ùi⟩ is used in Scottish Gaelic for /uː/ between a broad and a slender consonant.

⟨um⟩ is used in Portuguese for /ũ/, and in French to write /œ̃/ (only before a consonant and at the end of a word).

⟨úm⟩ is used in Portuguese for /ũ/ before a consonant.

⟨un⟩ is used in many languages for a nasal vowel. In Portuguese before a consonant, and in many West African languages, it is /ũ/, while in French it is /œ̃/, or among the younger generation /ɛ̃/. In Hanyu Pinyin, /u̯ən/ is spelled ⟨un⟩ after a consonant, ⟨wen⟩ initially.

⟨ún⟩ is used in Portuguese for /ũ/ before a consonant.

⟨ün⟩ is used in Tibetan Pinyin for /ỹ/.

⟨uŋ⟩ is used in Lakhota for the nasal vowel /ũ/.

⟨uo⟩ is used for /o/ in Chinese languages such as Nuosu, where ⟨o⟩ stands for /ɔ/.

⟨uq⟩ is used in Taa, for the pharyngealized vowel /uˤ/.

⟨ur⟩ is used in Central Alaskan Yup'ik for /ʁʷ/, and to write the tense vowel /u/ in Nuosu.

⟨uu⟩ is used in many languages with phonemic long vowels, for /uː/.

In Dutch, it is used for /y/.

⟨uw⟩ is used in Dutch for /yu̯/, e.g. uw "yours", duwen "to push".

In Cornish it is used for /iʊ/ or /yʊ/.

⟨uy⟩ is used in Afrikaans for /œy/.

⟨ux⟩ is unofficially used in Esperanto, instead of ⟨ŭ⟩, for /u̯/.

⟨u_e⟩ (a split digraph) is used in English for /juː/ or /uː/.

== V ==
⟨vb⟩ is used in the General Alphabet of Cameroon Languages for the labiodental flap /ⱱ/.

⟨vg⟩ was used in the Tindall orthography of Khoekhoe for the voiceless palatal click /ǂ/.

⟨vh⟩ represents /v̤/ in Shona. It was also used in the Tindall orthography of Khoekhoe for the aspirated palatal click /ǂʰ/.

⟨vk⟩ was used in the Tindall orthography of Khoekhoe for the voiceless palatal click /ǂ/ (equivalent to ⟨vg⟩).

⟨vn⟩ was used in the Tindall orthography of Khoekhoe for the palatal nasal click /ᵑǂ/.

⟨vv⟩ is used in Central Alaskan Yup'ik for /f/.

⟨vr⟩ is used in Quechua.

== W ==
⟨wh⟩ is used in English for /hw/, the continuation of the PIE labiovelar */kʷ/ (which became ⟨qu⟩ in Latin and the Romance languages). Most English question words begin with this digraph, hence the terms wh-word and wh-question. In Old English, /hw/ was spelled ⟨huu⟩ or ⟨hƿ⟩, and only the former was retained during the Middle English period, becoming ⟨hw⟩ during the gradual development of the letter ⟨w⟩ during the 14th-17th centuries. In most dialects it is now pronounced /w/, but a distinct pronunciation realized as a voiceless w sound, [ʍ], is retained in some areas: Scotland, central and southern Ireland, southeastern United States, and (mostly among older speakers) in New Zealand. In a few words (who, whose, etc.) the digraph represents /h/ universally. For details, see Pronunciation of English ⟨wh⟩.

In Māori, ⟨wh⟩ represents /ɸ/ or more commonly /f/, with some regional variations approaching /h/ or /hw/.
In the Taranaki region, for some speakers, this represents a glottalized /wʼ/.
In Xhosa, it represents /w̤/, a murmured variant of /w/ found in loan words.
In Cornish, it represents /ʍ/.

⟨wr⟩ is used in English for words which formerly began /wr/, now reduced to /r/ in virtually all dialects.

⟨wu⟩ is used in Hanyu Pinyin to write the vowel /u/ in initial position, as in the name Wuhan. It is sometimes found with this value in Romanized Korean as well, as in hanwu.

In Cantonese Romanisation, it is used to represent /wuː/ in an initial position or /uː/ in a non-initial position.

⟨ww⟩ is used in Haida (Bringhurst orthography) for glottalized /ˀw/.

⟨wx⟩ is used in Nambikwara for a glottalized /ˀw/.

== X ==
⟨xc⟩ is used etymologically in Portuguese for /s/ or /ʃ(s)/ before the front vowel letters ⟨e, i⟩.

⟨xf⟩ is used in the General Alphabet of Cameroon Languages for the labialized fricative /xʷ/.

⟨xg⟩ is used to write the click /ǁχ/ in Naro. It was used in the Tindall orthography of Khoekhoe for the voiceless lateral click /ǁ/.

⟨xh⟩ is used in Albanian to write the voiced postalveolar affricate /dʒ/, as in the surname Hoxha /ˈhɔdʒa/.

In Zulu and Xhosa it represents the voiceless aspirated alveolar lateral click /kǁʰ/, e.g. Xhosa /ˈkǁʰoːsa/.
In Walloon it represents a consonant that is variously /h/, /ʃ/, /ç ~ x/, depending on the dialect.
In Canadian Tlingit it represents /χ/, which is represented by ⟨x̱⟩ in Alaska.

⟨xi⟩ is used in English for /kʃ/ in words such as flexion. (It is equivalent to ⟨c⟩ plus the digraph ⟨ti⟩, as in action.)

⟨xk⟩ was used in the Tindall orthography of Khoekhoe for the voiceless lateral click /ǁ/ (equivalent to ⟨xg⟩).

⟨xö⟩ is used as a letter of the Seri alphabet, where it represents a labialized uvular fricative, /χʷ/. It is placed between ⟨x⟩ and ⟨y⟩ in alphabetical order.

⟨xs⟩ is used etymologically in Portuguese. In the word exsudar /ˌe.su.ˈda(ʁ)/ in Brazilian Portuguese, it stands for /s/. In European Portuguese this digraph changed to /ʃs/ in the early 20th century and the word came to be pronounced as /ɐjʃ.su.ˈðaɾ/.

⟨xu⟩ was used in the Ossete Latin alphabet for /χʷ/.

⟨xw⟩ is used in the Kurdish and the Tlingit language for /xʷ/.

⟨x̱w⟩ is used in Alaskan Tlingit for /χʷ/, which in Canada is written ⟨xhw⟩.

⟨xx⟩ is used in Hadza for the glottalized click /ᵑǁˀ/, and in Cypriot Arabic for /χː/.

⟨xy⟩ is used in the Hmong Romanized Popular Alphabet to write /ç/.

== Y ==
⟨ye⟩ used in various languages. In English it represents /aɪ/ word finally, e.g. bye or dye.

⟨yh⟩ was used in the pre-1985 orthography of Guinea, for the "ejective y" or glottalic palatal approximant [ˀj] or [j̰] in Pular (a Fula language) and Hausa. In the current orthography it is now written ⟨ƴ⟩. In Xhosa it represents /j̤/. In a handful of Australian languages, it represents a "dental semivowel".

⟨yi⟩ is used in Hanyu Pinyin to write /i/ when it forms an entire syllable.

⟨yk⟩ is used in Yanyuwa for a pre-velar stop, /ɡ̟ ~ k̟/.

⟨ym⟩ is used in French to write /ɛ̃/ (/im/ before another vowel), as in thym /tɛ̃/ "thyme".

⟨yn⟩ is used in French to write /ɛ̃/ in some words of Greek origin, such as syncope /sɛ̃kɔp/ "syncope".

⟨yr⟩ is used to write the trilled vowel /r̝/ in Chinese languages such as Nuosu.

⟨yu⟩ is used in romanized Chinese to write the vowel /y/ present in most dialects. In Hanyu Pinyin it is used for /y/ in initial position, whereas in Cantonese Jyutping it is used for /yː/ in non-initial position. In the Yale romanization of Cantonese and Cantonese Romanisation, it represents /jyː/ in an initial position and /yː/ in a non-initial position.

⟨yw⟩ is used for /jʷ/ in Arrernte and for doubly articulated /ɥ/ in Yélî Dnye.

It is used in Cornish for the diphthongs /iʊ/, /ɪʊ/, or /ɛʊ/.

⟨yx⟩ in used in Nambikwara for a glottalized /ˀj/.

⟨yy⟩ is used in some languages such as Finnish to write the long vowel /yː/.

In Haida (Bringhurst orthography) it is represents glottalized /ˀj/.
Used in some Asturian dialects to represent /ɟ͡ʝ/.

⟨y_e⟩ (a split digraph) is used in English for /aɪ/ (equivalent to ⟨i_e⟩).

== Z ==
⟨zh⟩ represents the voiced postalveolar fricative (/ʒ/), like the ⟨s⟩ in pleasure, in Albanian, Kirundi, Xhosa, Sotho, Venda, Swazi, and Native American orthographies such as Ojibwe, Navajo and other Athabaskan languages (Dene, Dogrib, North and South Slavey, Kaska, Hän, Gwich'in and Dena'ina).

It is used for the same sound in some English-language dictionaries, as well as to transliterate the sound when represented by Cyrillic ⟨ж⟩ and Persian ⟨ژ⟩ into English, but is rarely seen in English words, appearing primarily in foreign borrowings (e.g. muzhik) and slang (e.g. zhoosh).
It is found in Breton in words that are pronounced with /z/ in some dialects and /h/ in others.
In Hanyu Pinyin, ⟨zh⟩ represents the voiceless retroflex affricate /tʂ/.
When Malayalam and Tamil are transliterated into the Latin script, ⟨zh⟩ represents a retroflex approximant (Malayalam ഴ and Tamil ழ ⟨ḻ⟩ [ɻ]).

⟨zi⟩ in Polish represents /ʑ/ whenever it precedes a vowel, and /ʑi/ whenever it precedes a consonant (or in the end of the word), and is considered a graphic variant of ⟨ź⟩ appearing in other situations.

⟨zl⟩ is used in the General Alphabet of Cameroon Languages for the voiced lateral fricative /ɮ/.

⟨zr⟩ is used in the General Alphabet of Cameroon Languages for /ʐ/.

⟨zs⟩ is the last (forty-fourth) letter of the Hungarian alphabet. Its name is zsé [ʒeː] and represents /ʒ/, a voiced postalveolar fricative, similar to ⟨j⟩ in Jacques and beside ⟨s⟩ in vision. A few examples are rózsa "rose" and zsír "fat".

⟨zv⟩ is used in Shona to write the whistled sibilant /z͎/. This was written ⟨ɀ⟩ from 1931 to 1955.

⟨zz⟩ is used for /dz/ in Chinese languages such as Nuosu. It is also used with that value in romanized Kabyle.

In medieval Czech, it stood for /s/.
In Hadza it is ejective /tsʼ/.

== Other ==
⟨ɛn⟩, capital ⟨Ɛn⟩, is used in many West African languages for the nasal vowel /ɛ̃/. ⟨ɛ⟩ is an "open e".

⟨ɔn⟩, capital ⟨Ɔn⟩, is used in many West African languages for the nasal vowel /ɔ̃/. ⟨ɔ⟩ is an "open o".

⟨œu⟩, capital ⟨Œu⟩, is used in French for the vowels /œ/ and /ø/. The first element of the digraph, ⟨œ⟩, is itself is a ligature of ⟨o⟩ and ⟨e⟩, and ⟨œu⟩ may also be written as the trigraph ⟨oeu⟩.

⟨ŋg⟩ is used in the General Alphabet of Cameroon Languages for /ᵑɡ/.

⟨ŋk⟩ is used in the General Alphabet of Cameroon Languages for /ᵑk/.

⟨ŋm⟩ is used in the General Alphabet of Cameroon Languages for the labial-velar nasal /ŋ͡m/.

⟨ŋv⟩, capital ⟨Ŋv⟩, was used for /ŋʷ/ in the old orthography of Zhuang and Bouyei; this is now spelled with the trigraph ⟨ngv⟩.

⟨ŋʼ⟩ is used in Adzera for the prenasalized glottal stop /ⁿʔ/.

⟨ſh⟩, capital ⟨SH⟩ or sometimes ⟨ŞH⟩, was a digraph used in the Slovene Bohorič alphabet for /ʃ/. The first element, ⟨ſ⟩, the long s, is an archaic non-final form of the letter ⟨s⟩.

⟨ǃʼ⟩ ⟨ǀʼ⟩ ⟨ǁʼ⟩ ⟨ǂʼ⟩ are used in Juǀʼhoan for its four glottalized nasal clicks, /ᵑǃˀ, ᵑǀˀ, ᵑǁˀ, ᵑǂˀ/.

⟨ǃg⟩ ⟨ǀg⟩ ⟨ǁg⟩ ⟨ǂg⟩ are used in Khoekhoe for its four tenuis clicks, /ǃ, ǀ, ǁ, ǂ/.

⟨ǃh⟩ ⟨ǀh⟩ ⟨ǁh⟩ ⟨ǂh⟩ are used in Khoekhoe for its four aspirated nasal clicks, /ᵑ̊ǃʰ, ᵑ̊ǀʰ, ᵑ̊ǁʰ, ᵑ̊ǂʰ/, and in Juǀʼhoan for its plain aspirated clicks, /ǃʰ, ǀʰ, ǁʰ, ǂʰ/.

⟨ǃk⟩ ⟨ǀk⟩ ⟨ǁk⟩ ⟨ǂk⟩ are used in Juǀʼhoan for its four affricate ejective-contour clicks, /ǃ͡χʼ, ǀ͡χʼ, ǁ͡χʼ, ǂ͡χʼ/.

⟨ǃn⟩ ⟨ǀn⟩ ⟨ǁn⟩ ⟨ǂn⟩ are used in Khoekhoe for its four plain nasal clicks, /ᵑǃ, ᵑǀ, ᵑǁ, ᵑǂ/.

⟨ǃx⟩ ⟨ǀx⟩ ⟨ǁx⟩ ⟨ǂx⟩ are used in Juǀʼhoan for its four affricate pulmonic-contour clicks, /ǃ͡χ, ǀ͡χ, ǁ͡χ, ǂ͡χ/.

⟨ьj⟩ was used in Yañalif and some Turkic languages for the diphthong /ɤj/.

== See also ==
- Trigraph
  - List of Latin-script trigraphs
- Tetragraph
  - List of Latin-script tetragraphs
- Pentagraph
  - List of Latin-script pentagraphs
- Hexagraph
- Heptagraph
- List of Latin letters
- List of Cyrillic digraphs
