= System X =

X System or System X may refer to:

== System X ==
- IBM System x, server platform
- System X (album)
- System X (supercomputer), supercomputer
- System X (telephony), digital switching platform

== X System ==
- X-sistemo in Esperanto orthography
- SIGSALY, secure voice transmission system; sometimes called "X System"
- X Window System

== See also ==
- System 10 (disambiguation)
- OSX (disambiguation)
- OS 10
