= System 10 =

System 10 or System Ten may refer to:

== Computing ==
- DECsystem-10, the mainframe line by Digital Equipment Corporation
- Singer System 10, the business minicomputer
- IBM System z10, the mainframe line by IBM
- Tandy 10 Business Computer System, the business minicomputer

=== Operating systems ===
- Android 10, the Google operating system
- BlackBerry 10, the BlackBerry operating system
- Linux distribution versions:
  - Debian 10, the Debian Project distribution (2019)
  - Fedora 10, the RedHat-based distribution (2008)
  - Gentoo 10, the special release of Gentoo distribution (2009)
  - Mandriva 10, the Mandriva distribution (2004)
  - Mint 10, the Ubuntu-based distribution (2010)
  - openSUSE 10, the openSUSE Project distribution (2005)
  - Ubuntu 10.4 and Ubuntu 10.10, the Canonical distribution (2010)
- Mac OS X, the Apple operating system now known as macOS
- TOPS-10, the Digital Equipment Corporation operating system
- FTOS, the Force10 operating system
- FreeBSD 10, the FreeBSD Project operating system
- Version 10 Unix, the last version of the original Unix of Bell Labs
- Windows 10, the Microsoft operating system

== Sports ==
- 10-point must system, the boxing strategy
- Perfect 10 (gymnastics), the scoring system

== Other ==
- Base-ten number system, the decimal numeral system
- ICD-10 Procedure Coding System, the system of medical classification
- Pentax System 10, the Pentax single-lens camera
- STS-10 (Space Transportation System-10), a cancelled Space Shuttle mission

== See also ==
- System X (disambiguation)
- OSX (disambiguation)
- OS 10

Preceded by System 9	System 10	Succeeded by System 11
