= OSX (disambiguation) =

OS X is a former name of Apple's operating system macOS.

OSX or OS X may also refer to:

- DC/OSx, 1980s-era Unix operating system by Pyramid Technology
- Old Saxon (ISO 639-3 language code), an early form of Low German
- OSX, a Brazilian shipbuilding company, part of the EBX Group
- OS-X series, a series of sounding rockets built by OneSpace
- Xalapa Symphony Orchestra, from an acronym for its Spanish name Orquesta Sinfónica de Xalapa

== See also ==
- System 10 (disambiguation)
- System X (disambiguation)
