= System 12 =

System 12 may refer to

- Namco System 12, a video game board.
- IBM Business System 12, a relational database management system.
- ITT System 12 was an early digital telephone exchange, by ITT Corporation

Preceded by System 11	System 12	Succeeded by System 13
