= System 11 =

System 11 may refer to:

== Computing ==
- Namco System 11, the arcade system board
- X Window System (or X11), a windowing system

=== Operating systems ===
- Android 11, the Google operating system
- PDP-11 operating systems
  - RT-11, real-time operating system
  - RSX-11
  - DSM-11
  - BATCH-11/DOS-11
  - Ultrix-11
- Linux operating system distributive versions:
  - Debian 11, the Debian Project distributive
  - Fedora 11, the RedHat-based distributive
  - Mandriva 11, the Mandriva distributive
  - Mint 11, the Ubuntu-based distributive
  - openSUSE 11, the openSUSE Project distributive
  - Ubuntu 11.4 and Ubuntu 11.10, the Canonical distributive (2011)
- Windows 11, the Microsoft operating system

== Other ==
- STS-11 (Space Transportation System-11), a cancelled Space Shuttle mission
- Undecimal numbering system

== See also ==
- OS 11

Preceded by System 10	System 11	Succeeded by System 12
