= Matthäus =

Matthäus is a given name or surname. Notable people with the name include:

Surname

- Lothar Matthäus, (born 1961), German former football player and manager

Given name

- Matthäus Aurogallus, Professor of Hebrew at the University of Wittenberg
- Matthäus Dresser, German humanist and historian
- Matthäus Daniel Pöppelmann, German master builder who helped to rebuild Dresden after the fire of 1685
- Matthäus Lang von Wellenburg, German statesman and archbishop of Salzburg
- Matthäus Merian, Swiss engraver

== See also ==
- Matthew (name)
