= Transcription of Australian Aboriginal languages =

Orthography of the Aboriginal Languages native to Australia

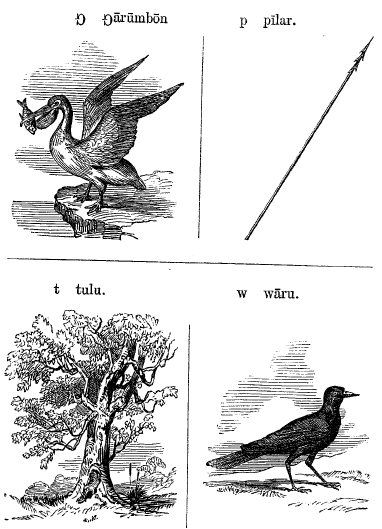
A page from an 1856 book illustrating the letters of the alphabet for Gamilaraay at that time. Note the use of the letter eng (ŋ) and macrons (ˉ).

Prior to the arrival of Europeans, Australian Aboriginal languages had been purely spoken languages, and had no writing system. On their arrival, Latin script became a standard for transcription of Australian Aboriginal languages, but the details of how the sounds were represented has varied over time and from writer to writer, sometimes resulting in a great many variant spellings of the same word or name.

== Early writing ==
At first, most Australian languages were written following English orthography (or in a few cases, German orthography), as it sounded to the writer. This meant that sounds which were distinguished in Australian languages but not in English were written identically, while at the same time sounds which were allophones in Australian languages but distinct in English were written differently.

Most Aboriginal words used in English follow these early conventions, and therefore do not usually give a good idea of how the word was pronounced in the original language.

Transcriptions of Australian languages through time
Language	Meaning	Early spellings	Modern spelling	Pronunciation (International Phonetic Alphabet)	Notes
Guugu Yimithirr	“tongue”	unjar (1770) ngandar (1901)	nganhdhaar (1979)	[ŋan̪d̪aːɻ]	Early spellings may miss the word-initial [ŋ], and fail to properly distinguish dental consonants.
Gamilaraay	“honey”	wuddul (1903)	warrul (1993)	[waɾul]	Early spellings may fail to distinguish between [ɾ] and [d], which are allophones in English but distinct in Australian languages.

Writers with more linguistic knowledge sometimes employed symbols such as ⟨ŋ⟩ or ⟨ġ⟩ for /ŋ/, ⟨ñ⟩ for /ɲ/, macrons ⟨ˉ⟩ or circumflexes ⟨ˆ⟩ for long vowels, breves ⟨˘⟩ for short vowels, but these were often applied inconsistently.

== Modern practical orthography ==
Linguists working with Australian languages today purposely use unambiguous phonemic orthographies based on detailed phonological analysis of the language in question. In orthographies of this kind each spoken word can only be written one way, and each written word can only be read one way.

Usually, but not always, practical orthographies use just the letters of the basic Roman alphabet. This necessitates the use of digraphs for sounds that do not have a standard character. In some cases this can lead to ambiguities, for example where the single sound /ŋ/ and the consonant cluster /nɡ/ could both be written as ⟨ng⟩. These are commonly distinguished by writing the cluster ⟨n.g⟩ (inserting a full stop), ⟨n’g⟩ (inserting an apostrophe), or ⟨nk⟩.

=== Vowels and semivowels ===
Most Australian languages distinguish just three vowels, which are written ⟨i⟩, ⟨a⟩ and ⟨u⟩. Even though they may sound like ⟨e⟩ or ⟨o⟩ at times, they are not written ⟨e⟩ or ⟨o⟩, e.g. the Martuthunira word wirrirri "flame" is pronounced as [weɾeɾɪ]. Long vowels are represented by double letters, i.e. ⟨ii⟩ /iː/, ⟨aa⟩ /aː/, ⟨uu⟩ /uː/.

The semivowels ⟨w⟩ and ⟨y⟩ are usually pronounced as in English. In some languages, ⟨w⟩ may not be pronounced next to ⟨u⟩, and ⟨y⟩ next to ⟨i⟩, but for various reasons a linguist may still choose to write them, so that e.g. Gamilaraay yinarr "woman" is actually pronounced [inar].

A handful of languages have a dental semivowel, which is written ⟨yh⟩ (see Place of articulation below).

=== Rhotics ===
Most Australian languages have two rhotics or r-like sounds: a retroflex approximant, as in American English, written ⟨r⟩; and a trill or flap (both of which are found in Spanish), written ⟨rr⟩.

In languages that have only one of the two r's, it is simply written ⟨r⟩.

=== Place of articulation ===
The bilabial, velar and alveolar consonants are usually written the same as in English, i.e. ⟨p⟩ /p/, ⟨b⟩ /b/, ⟨m⟩ /m/, ⟨k⟩ /k/, ⟨g⟩ /ɡ/, ⟨ng⟩ /ŋ/, ⟨t⟩ /t/, ⟨d⟩ /d/, ⟨n⟩ /n/, ⟨l⟩ /l/. ⟨ng⟩ may also be written using the non-English letter ⟨ŋ⟩, called eng. Note that ⟨ŋ⟩ sounds like the ng in singer, not as in finger; the latter would be written ⟨ŋg⟩.

Palatal consonants are often represented by a digraph made of an alveolar consonant + ⟨j⟩ or ⟨y⟩, i.e. /c ɟ ɲ ʎ/ can be written ⟨tj⟩/⟨ty⟩, ⟨dj⟩/⟨dy⟩, ⟨nj⟩/⟨ny⟩, and ⟨lj⟩/⟨ly⟩. ⟨c⟩ and ⟨j⟩ are other possible ways of writing the palatal stops.

Dental consonants are represented by a digraph made of an alveolar consonant + ⟨h⟩, i.e. ⟨th⟩ /t̪/, ⟨dh⟩ /d̪/, ⟨nh⟩ /n̪/, ⟨lh⟩ /l̪/. Note that ⟨th⟩ is not a fricative as in Australian English, but a stop as in Irish English.

Retroflex consonants are usually represented by a digraph made of ⟨r⟩ + an alveolar consonant, i.e. ⟨rt⟩ /ʈ/, ⟨rd⟩ /ɖ/, ⟨rn⟩ /ɳ/, ⟨rl⟩ /ɭ/, as in Standard Swedish. In some varieties, such as Pitjantjatjara, a digraph is not used and instead the alveolar consonant is underlined to indicate that it is retroflex thus: ⟨ṯ⟩, ⟨ṉ⟩ and ⟨ḻ⟩.

A handful of languages have palato-velar consonants, between palatal and velar. For Yanyuwa, these are written ⟨yk⟩ /ɡ̟/, ⟨nyk⟩ /ⁿɡ̟/ (a prenasalised stop—see Prenasalisation below), ⟨nyng⟩ /ŋ̟/.

=== Voicing of stops ===
Most Australian languages do not distinguish between voiced and voiceless stops, so that e.g. t and d both occur as variants of the same sound. Both the voiced and voiceless allophone will usually be written the same way, but whether to use the voiceless symbol or the voiced symbol varies depending on which occurs more frequently in the language. Some languages have been written using the voiced symbols by one linguist and the voiceless symbols by another. Moreover, some linguists choose to use voiceless symbols for some consonants in a language and voiced symbols for others.

Some languages do distinguish between voiced and voiceless stops, however.

=== Prenasalisation ===
Some languages have prenasalized consonants, a stop preceded by a nasal sound which is considered one consonant. In Yanyuwa these are written ⟨mb⟩ /ᵐb/, ⟨ngk⟩ /ᵑɡ/, ⟨nj⟩ /ᶮɟ/, ⟨nth⟩ /ⁿd̪/, ⟨nd⟩ /ⁿd/, ⟨rnd⟩ /ᶯɖ/.

== Bibliography ==
- Dixon, R. M. W. (2002). Australian Languages: Their Nature and Development. Cambridge: Cambridge University Press.
- McGregor, William (2004). The Languages of the Kimberley, Western Australia. London, New York: Taylor & Francis. pp. 21–26.
