= Standard Written Form =

Cornish orthographic standard

The Standard Written Form or SWF (Cornish: Furv Skrifys Savonek) of the Cornish language is an orthography standard that is designed to "provide public bodies and the educational system with a universally acceptable, inclusive, and neutral orthography". It was the outcome of a process initiated by the creation of the public body Cornish Language Partnership, which identified a need to agree on a single standard orthography in order to end previous orthographical disagreements, secure government funding, and increase the use of Cornish in Cornwall.

The new form was agreed in May 2008 after two years of negotiations, and was influenced by all the previous orthographies. The negotiating teams comprised members of all the main Cornish language groups, Kesva an Taves Kernewek, Kowethas an Yeth Kernewek, Agan Tavas, and Cussel an Tavas Kernuak, and received input from experts and academics from Europe and the United States. The agreement meant that Cornish became officially accepted and funded, with support from the UK government and the European Union.

In June 2009, the Gorsedh Kernow voted overwhelmingly to adopt the Standard Written Form.

In 2013, the SWF was reviewed in a process intended to identify problems and issues with the orthography. A small number of changes were made to the SWF, which made the orthography easier for learners and went some way to reducing the spelling difference between dialects.

In 2021, a third edition of the SWF was published by the Akademi Kernewek, incorporating the decisions of the 2014 review and work over the subsequent decade.

Despite being used by the vast majority of Cornish classes, the Standard Written Form, Middle with Main Graphs, is only responsible for a quarter of the written output of Cornish during the period 2009 - 2024 (i.e. following its introduction). Other varieties of the SWF are used in Cornish language wikipedia as well as published books, e.g. the multilingual Babadada dictionary, but most Cornish literary content is published in legacy orthographies or Kernowek Standard.

== Orthography ==
The Standard Written Form recognises Revived Middle Cornish (RMC), Tudor Cornish (TC), and Revived Late Cornish (RLC) as variants of equal standing on which it bases its system. The original 2008 Specification states that "[t]he orthography as a whole leans toward a Middle Cornish base, since in many cases the correct RLC or TC pronunciation can be deduced from an RMC form, but not vice versa".

=== Monophthongs ===
Unstressed vowels are always short. Stressed vowels in monosyllables are long when followed by a single consonant or by nothing, e.g. Cornish: gwag RMC [ɡwaːɡ], RLC [ɡwæːɡ] "empty", Cornish: lo RMC [lɔː], RLC [loː] "spoon", and short when followed by a double consonant or a consonant cluster, e.g. Cornish: ass RMC [as], RLC [æs] "how"; Cornish: hons RMC [hɔns], RLC [hɔnz] "yonder". Exceptions are that long vowels precede st, e.g. Cornish: lost RMC & RLC [lɔːst] "tail", and also sk and sp in RMC, e.g. Cornish: Pask [paːsk] "Easter". Stressed vowels in polysyllables are short except in the case of conservative RMC speakers, who may pronounce vowels long before single consonants and st (and, for some, sk and sp), e.g. Cornish: gwagen RMC [ɡwa(ː)ɡɛn], RLC [ɡwæɡɐn] "a blank".

Letter	RMC		TC & RLC	
Letter	Short	Long	Short	Long
a	[a]	[aː]	[æ]^{1}	[æː]
e	[ɛ]	[ɛː]	[ɛ]^{1}	[eː]
eu	[œ]^{2}	[øː]^{3}	[ɛ]	[eː]
i	[i]	[iː]	[ɪ]	[iː]^{4}
o^{5}	[ɔ], [ɤ]	[ɔː]	[ɔ]^{1}, [ɤ]^{1}	[oː]
oa^{6}	-	-	-	[ɒː]
oo^{7}	-	[oː]	-	[oː], [uː]^{8}
ou	[u]	[uː]	[ʊ]^{1}	[uː]
u	[ʏ]^{9}	[yː]	[ɪ]^{10}	[iː]^{10}
y^{11}	[ɪ]	[ɪː]	[ɪ]	[iː]

^1May be reduced to [ɐ] when unstressed, which is given as [ə] in the original Specification but as [ɐ] in the updated online dictionary.

^2Unrounded to [ɛ] when unstressed.

^3Given as [œ] in the original Specification but as [øː] in the updated online dictionary.

^4Often realised as [əɪ] in RLC in stressed open syllables, in which case it is written with the variant graph ei.

^5Can either represent [ɔ], the short version of long o [ɔː/oː], or [ɤ], the short counterpart to oo [oː/uː]. When representing [ɤ], the 2013 Review suggests o could be written as ò for clarity in "dictionaries and teaching materials".

^6Used as a variant graph by RLC speakers in a few words where RMC and TC speakers use long a, [aː] and [æː] respectively. After the 2013 Review, used solely in Cornish: boas "be", Cornish: broas "big", Cornish: doas "come", Cornish: moas "go", and their derivatives.

^7Used in word only when both Kernewek Kemmyn (KK) writes oe and RLC realises the sound [uː]. Therefore, oo does not always correspond to KK, e.g. SWF Cornish: loor, KK Cornish: loer "moon" both [loːr], but SWF Cornish: hwor [ʍɔːr], KK Cornish: hwoer [hwoːr] "sister". This is because evidence suggests the second group of words with o underwent a different phonological development to the first group with oe.

^8Pronounced solely as [uː] in RLC.

^9Given as [y] in the original Specification but as [ʏ] in the updated online dictionary. Reduced to [ɪ] when unstressed.

^10Changed to [ɪʊ] when stressed and word-final or before gh. In a small number of words, u can represent [ʊ] when short or [uː] or [ɪʊ] when long in TC and RLC. The 2013 Review recommends these be spelt optionally as ù and û respectively in "dictionaries and teaching materials".

^11Can be pronounced [ɛ, eː] and therefore spelt e in TC and RLC.

=== Diphthongs ===
Letter	RMC	TC	RLC
aw	[aʊ]	[æʊ]^{1}	
ay	[aɪ]	[əɪ], [ɛː]	
ei^{2}	-		[əɪ]
ew	[ɛʊ]		
ey	[ɛɪ]	[əɪ]	
iw	[iʊ]	[ɪʊ]	
ow	[ɔʊ]		[ɔʊ], [uː]^{3}
oy	[ɔɪ]^{4}		
uw	[ʏʊ]^{5}	[ɪʊ]	
yw	[ɪʊ]		[ɛʊ]^{6}

^1 Loanwords spelt with aw are often pronounced [ɒ(ː)] in TC and RLC.

^2 Used as a variant graph by RLC when i is diphthongised to [əɪ] in stressed open syllables.

^3 Used in hiatus.

^4 A few monosyllables may keep the more conservative pronunciation [ʊɪ] in RLC, e.g. Cornish: moy [mʊɪ] "more", Cornish: oy [ʊɪ] "egg".

^5 Given as [yʊ] in the original Specification but as [ʏʊ] in the updated online dictionary.

^6 The variant graph ew may be used instead of yw to represent the pronunciation [ɛʊ].

=== Consonants ===
Letter	RMC	TC	RLC
b	[b]		
c	[s]		
cch	[tʃː]	[tʃ]	
ch	[tʃ]		
ck^{1}	[kː], [k]	[k]	
cy^{2}	[sj]	[ʃ(j)]	
d	[d]		
dh	[ð]	[ð], [θ]^{3}	[ð]
f	[f]		[f], [v]^{4}
ff	[fː]	[f]	
g	[ɡ]		
gh	[x]		[h]
ggh	[xː]	[h]	
h	[h]		
hw	[ʍ]		
j	[dʒ]		
k	[k]		
kk	[kː]	[k]	
ks	[ks], [ɡz]		
l	[l]		
ll	[lː]	[lʰ], [l]	[lʰ]
m	[m]		
mm	[mː]	[m]	[ᵇm]^{5}
n	[n]		
nn	[nː]	[nʰ], [n]	[ᵈn]^{5}
p	[p]		
pp	[pː]	[p]	
r	[r]	[ɹ]	[ɹ],[ɾ]
rr	[rː]	[ɾʰ], [ɹ]	[ɾʰ]
s	[s], [z]^{6}		
sh	[ʃ]		
ss	[sː], [s]	[s]	
ssh	[ʃː]	[ʃ]	
t	[t]		
th	[θ]		
tt	[tː]	[t]	
tth	[θː]	[θ]	
v	[v]	[v], [f]^{3}	[v]
w	[w]		
y	[j]		
z	[z]		

^1Used solely in words whose status as borrowings is in no doubt.

^2In certain borrowed words, such as Cornish: fondacyon RMC [fɔnˈdasjɔn], RLC [fənˈdæʃjɐn] "foundation".

^3TC speakers realise dh as [θ] and v as [f] word-finally in an unstressed syllable. RLC speakers may not even realise these sounds at all, although this is reflected in spelling, e.g. TC Cornish: menedh [ˈmɛnɐθ], RLC Cornish: mena [ˈmɛnɐ] "mountain".

^4[v] often occurs morpheme-initially before vowels. The mutation of [f] to [v] found in some varieties of Cornish is not shown in writing.

^5A few words spelt with mm and nn lack pre-occlusion in RLC. These include words thought to have entered the language after pre-occlusion occurred, e.g. Cornish: gramm "gramme", and words that fell out of use by the RLC period, e.g. Cornish: gonn "I know".

^6The distribution of [s] and [z] differs in each variety of Cornish. Some rules are common to almost all speakers, e.g. final s and medial s between vowels or a sonorant and a vowel are usually [z], whereas other rules are specific to certain varieties, e.g. RMC speakers usually realise initial s as [s] whereas RLC tend to prefer [z] (except in such clusters as sk, sl, sn, sp and st). The mutation of [s] to [z] found in some varieties of Cornish is not shown in writing. As an example, Cornish: Penn Sans has been transliterated into English as Penzance reflecting pronunciation.

== Alternative letters ==
At times, the various varieties of revived Cornish differ in their pronunciation of sounds. A number of strategies are employed in the Standard Written Form to deal with these differences and make the system usable for all.

=== Umbrella graphs ===
When a RMC sound is consistently a single different sound in RLC, the SWF uses what it terms umbrella graphs.

Letter	RMC	RLC
eu	[œ], [øː]^{1}	[ɛ], [eː]
gh	[x]	[h]
oo	[oː]	[uː]
u	[ʏ]^{2}, [yː]	[ɪ], [iː]

=== Variant graphs ===
Where an umbrella graph is considered unworkable, variant graphs may be used to spell a word. The SWF does not stipulate that either only RMC or RLC variant graphs must be used, for instance, a typical TC speaker will choose the letters that best reflect their own pronunciation.

RMC		RLC	
Letter	Pronunciation	Letter	Pronunciation
a	[aː]	oa	[ɒː]^{1}
ew	[ɛʊ]	ow	[ɔʊ]
i	[i]	ei^{2}	[əɪ]
mm	[mː]	bm	[ᵇm]^{3}
nn	[nː]	dn	[ᵈn]^{3}
s	[s], [z]	j	[dʒ]
y	[ɪ], [ɪː]	e	[ɛ], [eː]

=== Traditional graphs ===
A third set of alternative letters is the traditional graphs. As the name implies, these spellings are closer to those traditionally employed by Cornish writers, and so are preferred by some Cornish speakers today. Although traditional graphs are considered correct and may be used freely by individuals, they are unlike variant graphs in that they do not have equal standing with standard graphs and "will not appear in elementary language textbooks or in official documents produced by public bodies".

Standard	Traditional
hw	wh
i	y^{1}
k	c^{2}
ks	x
kw	qw

^1 When unstressed and word final

^2 Before a, l, o, r and u

== See also ==
- Unified Cornish
- Kernewek Kemmyn
- Modern Cornish
- Kernowek Standard
