= Kernowek Standard =

Variety of the revived Cornish language

Kernowek Standard (KS, Standard Cornish), its initial version spelt Kernowak Standard, is a variety of the spelling of revived Cornish. It has two specifications, the first of which was published as a draft proposal in March 2007, and the second of which was published as a practical orthography in May 2012.

== Kernowak Standard (KS1) ==
Its first iteration, then spelt Kernowak Standard and now designated KS1, was developed gradually by a group called UdnFormScrefys ('Single Written Form') as part of the Cornish language community's process of agreement on a Standard Written Form (SWF) for Cornish through the public body Cornish Language Partnership. It was published as a proposal in a series of revisions, Revision 11 of which was released to the Cornish Language Commission on 26 March 2007. Revision 15 was published on 22 June 2007. Revision 16 was published on 14 November 2007. Its principal authors were Michael Everson, Neil Kennedy and Nicholas Williams.The orthography was meant to adhere to two basic requirements which the group identified with: to be based on orthographic forms attested in the Cornish literary scribal tradition, and to have an unambiguous relationship between spelling and sounds. To embrace both Middle and Late Cornish forms, Kernowak Standard took as its foundation the late Middle Cornish play Creation of the World by William Jordan (1611). On 14 October 2007, during the process of agreeing a Standard Written Form for Cornish, Kernowak Standard (as KS1) was designated to provide a key source of input into the new SWF, along with another orthography, Kernewek Kemmyn.

== Kernowek Standard (KS2) ==
After the publication of the specification of the agreed Standard Written Form, members of UdnFormScrefys, after scrutinising the published description, decided to form a new, public group, called Spellyans ('Spelling'). This group undertook to study the SWF, to determine what shortcomings it might have, and to propose and implement solutions to those shortcomings. The group identified what they saw as a number of inconsistencies, ambiguities, and errors, and discussion on an online discussion list led to the publication of a number of texts in the resulting orthography, Kernowek Standard, designated as KS and not KS2, culminating in the publication of the Bible in Cornish and a comprehensive grammar, Desky Kernowek on 1 May 2012.

Before the Standard Written Form was reviewed in 2013, KS was described by its proponents as a proposal for a number of changes to be made to the SWF. The following changes were proposed, none of which were ultimately adopted by the Cornish Language Partnership during the SWF's review:

- The supporters of KS argue that the SWF inherited what the group calls an "inconsistency" from Kernewek Kemmyn with regard to the distribution of the letters ⟨i⟩ and ⟨y⟩ outside monosyllables. For example, the SWF currently has palys 'palace' and gonis 'work', but it also has kegin 'kitchen' and kemmyn 'common', even though the final sound is the same. Supporters of the current distribution argue that it is etymological and maintains the correct sound when suffixes are added (singular kegin becomes plural keginow).
- The group also argues that the SWF is ambiguous and inconsistent in its use of ⟨u⟩, which can be pronounced a number of ways. KS proposed the use of ⟨û⟩ for /uː/, e.g. frût 'fruit', to prevent confusion with another ⟨u⟩ sound that can be pronounced either /iː/ or /yː/ (e.g. tus 'people'), and ⟨ù⟩ for short /ʊ/, e.g. pùb 'every', also to prevent confusion with the ⟨u⟩ above.
- The addition of the digraphs ⟨ai⟩ [eː], to distinguish from ⟨ay⟩ [aɪ] and ⟨ey⟩ /əɪ/, and ⟨au⟩ /ɔ/ ([ɔː]~[ɔ]) to distinguish from ⟨aw⟩ /aʊ/.
- The principal devisor of Kernowek Standard, Nicholas Williams, argues that current use of the graphs (-v⟩ and ⟨-dh⟩ in final unstressed position results in incorrect pronunciation. He maintains that a consonant switch between stressed and unstressed final position should be made, stressed ⟨-v⟩ and ⟨-dh⟩ switching to unstressed ⟨-f⟩ and ⟨-th⟩ respectively, similar to the SWF's current ⟨g⟩/⟨k⟩ and ⟨b⟩/⟨p⟩ switch.
- Correction of an inconsistency between menydh 'mountain' (Welsh mynydd) and nowyth 'new' (Welsh newydd). In KS, both are spelt with -th because they are in final unstressed syllables. During the SWF review, the spelling of nowydh was accepted for the SWF. The supporters of KS argue that this was the wrong one of the two choices.

== Importance to Cornish literature ==
Despite not being taught in most Cornish classes, Kernowek Standard is the most used orthography in present day Cornish. A recent study found that 36% of Cornish literature for the period 2009 - 2024 (i.e. the period following the introduction of the Standard Written Form), significantly more than for the Standard Written Form itself.
