= Substitutions of the Esperanto alphabet =

ASCII substitutions for diacritic characters

Esperanto pangram "Eĥoŝanĝo ĉiuĵaŭde" comparing three ASCII transliteration systems: H-sistemo, X-sistemo, and QWXY-sistemo

Substitutions of the Esperanto alphabet is the use of ASCII characters where use of the Esperanto alphabet characters (which use diacritics) is not possible. These substitutions originated in the early history of Esperanto due to the limitations of typewriters, and typically replace the accented letters (ĉ, ĝ, ĥ, ĵ, ŝ, and ŭ) with digraphs or other ASCII-compatible sequences. The two most common systems are the h-system (digraphs using h) and the x-system (digraphs using x), each with different advantages for sorting and unambiguous transliteration. Other graphic work-arounds have also been used in informal contexts.

The diacritics of Esperanto were designed with a French manual typewriter in mind, as French was the international language at the time Esperanto was developed. French typewriters have a dead key for the circumflex that can be used in combination with any other key. However, since the Esperanto letters with diacritics do not appear on standard computer keyboard layouts (French computer keyboards typically assign the circumflex only to letters that bear it in French orthography), various alternative methods have been devised for inputting them or substituting them in type. The original method, suggested by Zamenhof for people who did not have access to a French typewriter, was a set of digraphs in h, now known as the "Zamenhof-system" or "h-system". With the rise of computer word processing, the so-called "x-system" has become equally popular. With the advent of Unicode and more easily customized computer keyboards, the need for such workarounds has lessened.

== ASCII transliteration systems ==
There are two alternative orthographies in common use, which replace the circumflex letters with either h digraphs or x digraphs. Another system sometimes noted is a "QWXY system"; this is a carry-over from an early Esperanto keyboard app named Ĉapelilo, with which the Q W X and Y keys were assigned to the letters ⟨ĥ⟩, ⟨ŭ⟩, ⟨ŝ⟩, ⟨ĵ⟩, and the key sequences TX and DY to the letters ⟨ĉ⟩ and ⟨ĝ⟩. There are also graphic work-arounds, such as approximating the circumflexes with carets.

=== H-system ===
H-system H-sistemo
- Script type: Alphabet
- Creator: L. L. Zamenhof
- Created: 1888

ISO 15924
- ISO 15924: [IETF] eo-hsistemo

The original method of working around diacritics was developed by the creator of Esperanto, L. L. Zamenhof. He recommended using u in place of ŭ, and digraphs with h for the circumflex letters. For example, ŝ is replaced by sh, as in shanco for ŝanco (chance). Where proper orthography has sh, the letters should be separated with an apostrophe or a hyphen, as in ses-hora (six-hour) or flug'haveno (airport).

=== X-system ===
X-system X-sistemo, x-kodo
- Script type: Alphabet
- Created: 1962

ISO 15924
- ISO 15924: [IETF] eo-xsistemo

A more recent system for typing in Esperanto is the "x-system", which uses x instead of h for the digraphs, including ux for ŭ. For example, ŝ is represented by sx, as in sxi for ŝi and sxanco for ŝanco.

X-digraphs solve those problems of the h-system:

1. X is not a letter in the Esperanto alphabet, so its use introduces no ambiguity.
2. The digraphs are now nearly always correctly sorted after their single-letter counterparts; for example, sxanco (for ŝanco) comes after super, while h-system shanco comes before it. The sorting only fails in the infrequent case of a Z in compound or unassimilated words; for example, the compound word reuzi ("to reuse") would be sorted after reuxmatismo (for reŭmatismo "rheumatism").

The x-system has become as popular as the h-system, but it has long been perceived as being contrary to the Fundamento de Esperanto. However, in its 2007 decision, the Akademio de Esperanto has issued general permission for the use of surrogate systems for the representation of the diacritical letters of Esperanto, under the condition that this is being done only "when the circumstances do not permit the use of proper diacritics, and when due to a special need the h-system fixed in the Fundamento is not convenient." This provision covers situations such as using the x-system as a technical solution (to store data in plain ASCII) yet still displaying proper Unicode characters to the end user.

A practical problem of digraph substitution that the x-system does not completely resolve is in the complication of bilingual texts. Ux for ŭ is especially problematic when used alongside French text, because many French words end in aux or eux. Aux, for example, is a word in both languages (aŭ in Esperanto). Any automatic conversion of the text will alter the French words as well as the Esperanto. A few English words like "auxiliary" and "Euxine" can also suffer from such search-and-replace routines. One common solution, such as the one used in Wikipedia's MediaWiki software, is to use xx to escape the ux to ŭ conversion, e.g. "auxx" produces "aux". A few people have also proposed using "vx" instead of "ux" for ŭ to resolve this problem, but this variant of the system is rarely used.

=== Graphic work-arounds ===
There are several ad hoc workarounds used in email or on the internet, where the proper letters are often not supported, as seen also in non-ASCII orthographies such as German. These "slipped-hat" conventions make use of the caret (^) or greater than sign (>) to represent the circumflex. For example, ŝanco may be written ^sanco, s^anco, or s>anco. However, they have generally fallen out of favor. Before the internet age, Stefano la Colla had proposed shifting the caret onto the following vowel, since French circumflex vowels are supported in printing houses. That is, one would write ehôsângôj cîujâude for the nonsense phrase eĥoŝanĝoj ĉiuĵaŭde ("echo-change every Thursday"). However, this proposal has never been adopted.
