= Luis (letter) =

Letter of the Ogham alphabet

Luis (ᚂ) is the second letter (Irish "letter": sing.fid, pl.feda) of the Ogham alphabet, derived either from luise "flame" or from lus "herb". Its Proto-Indo-European root was either *lewk- 'to shine' or *h₁lewdʰ- 'to grow'. Its phonetic value is [l]. If the letter name follows the same pattern as ruise to ruis, it is likely that the letter was originally named from luise, though different kennings point to both meanings.

== Interpretation ==
Although the non-arboreal primary meanings of this letter name are well established, one of the arboreal glosses for this name in the Auraicept na n-Éces is cairtheand "mountain-ash", i.e. "rowan" (Modern Irish: caorthann). The associated verse is : lí súla "lustre of eye" (from the Bríatharogam Morann mic Moín). The Auraincept interprets this as "delightful to the eye is luis, i.e. rowan, owing to the beauty of its berries".

However, the other two primary Bríatharogaim do not easily fit this arboreal association. While this kenning may be based on the association with luise ("flame") due to the bright berries, the other kennings are likely based on the association with lus ("herb, plant"), hence food for cattle. In line with these kennings, the elm tree (Old Irish lem) is another arboreal gloss for luis from the Auraicept: "Cara ceathra, friend of cattle, to wit, elm. Cara, to wit, dear to the cattle is the elm for its bloom and for down".

== Bríatharogaim ==
In the medieval kennings, called Bríatharogaim (sing. Bríatharogam) or Word Oghams the verses associated with Luis are:

lí súla - "lustre of the eye" in the Bríatharogam Morann mic Moín

carae cethrae - "friend of cattle" in the Bríatharogam Mac ind Óc

lúth cethrae - "sustenance of cattle" in the Bríatharogam Con Culainn.

== Notes ==
While medieval and modern neopagan arboreal glosses (i.e. tree names) for the Ogham have been widely popularised (even for fade whose names do not translate as trees), the Old Irish In Lebor Ogaim (the Ogam Tract) also lists many other word values classified by type (e.g. birds, occupations, companies) for each fid. The filí (Old Irish filid, sing. fili) or poets of this period learned around one hundred and fifty variants of Ogham during their training, including these word-list forms.

Some of the notable Old Irish values of these for Luis include:

Enogam/Bird-ogam: lachu "duck"

Dathogam/Colour-ogam: liath "grey"

Ogam tirda/Agricultural ogam: loman "rope"

Danogam/Art-ogam: luamnacht "pilotage"

Ogam Cuidechtach/Company Ogam: Laichesa "Heroines"
