= Nion =

Letter of the Ogham alphabet

Nion (ᚅ) is the Irish name of the fifth letter (Irish "letter": sing.fid, pl.feda) of the Ogham alphabet, with phonetic value [n]. The Old Irish letter name, Nin, may derive from Old Irish homonyms nin/ninach meaning "fork/forked" and "loft/lofty". Nin is notable for being the old name that refers both to this specific letter, and to any of the Ogham letters in general. "Nin" is also an Irish word used for a grandma.

== Interpretation ==
The glossators of the Ogam Tract and the Auraicept na n-Éces seem to refer to at least two Irish words nin, meaning "part of a weaver's loom", and "a wave". The corresponding adjective ninach is glossed as gablach and used as a synonym of cross, and the word seems to be roughly synonymous with gabul "fork, forked branch", and is thus a plausible base for a name for "Ogham letters", which (at least the consonants), look like forks or combs.

The second nin seems to be cognate with Welsh nen "roof, heaven", with a meaning of "loftiness", with an adjective ninach "lofty". The kennings are explained by the glossators that weavers' beams were erected as signs of peace.

The "arboreal" tradition claims the word as ash-tree, concluding that looms were made of ash-wood. In some instances, the association with ash-wood, which is best known as the raw material for spears, the kenning was amended to "destruction of peace", as in the Auraicept:

Nin too is named from a tree, viz., ash, ut dicitur: A "check on peace" is nin, viz., ash, for of it are made the spear-shafts by which the peace is broken: or, A "check on peace" is ash-tree. Nin, that is the fork of a weaver's beam which is made of ash, which is in time of peace raised.

McManus suggests that the word for "forked branch" was also applied to the olive branch, the shaking of which in Irish tradition requested an interruption of a battle. The kennings related to beauty, on the other hand, are perhaps dependent on the second meaning of "lofty".

== Bríatharogaim ==
In the medieval kennings, called Bríatharogaim (sing. Bríatharogam) or Word Oghams the verses associated with Nin are:

costud síde: "establishing of peace" in the Bríatharogam Morann mic Moín

bág ban: "boast of women" in the Bríatharogam Mac ind Óc

bág maise: "boast of beauty" in the Bríatharogam Con Culainn.

== See also ==
- Naudiz
- Nun (letter)

== Notes ==
While medieval and modern neopagan arboreal glosses (i.e. tree names) for the Ogham have been widely popularised (even for feda whose names do not translate as trees), the Old Irish In Lebor Ogaim (the Ogam Tract) also lists many other word values classified by type (e.g. birds, occupations, companies) for each fid. The filí (Old Irish filid, sing. fili) or poets of this period learned around one hundred and fifty variants of Ogham during their training, including these word-list forms.

Some of the notable Old Irish values of these for Nion include:

Enogam/Bird-ogam: naescu "snipe"

Dathogam/Colour-ogam: necht "clear"

Ogam tirda/Agricultural ogam: nasc "ring"

Danogam/Art-ogam: notaireacht "notary work"

Ogam Cuidechtach/Company Ogam: Noeim "Saints"
