= Forfeda =

Additional letters of the Ogham alphabet

The forfeda (sing. forfid) are the "additional" letters of the Ogham alphabet, beyond the basic inventory of twenty signs. Their name derives from fid ("wood", a term also used for Ogham letters) and the prefix for- ("additional"). The most important of these are five forfeda which were arranged in their own aicme or class, and were invented in the Old Irish period, several centuries after the peak of Ogham usage. They appear to have represented sounds felt to be missing from the original alphabet, maybe é(o), ó(i), ú(i), p and ch.

== The "aicme" forfeda ==
The five "aicme" forfeda are glossed in the manuscripts Auraicept na n-Éces ('The Scholars' Primer), De dúilib feda ('Elements of the Letters') and In Lebor Ogaim ('The Book of Ogam'), by several Bríatharogaim ("word oghams"), or two word kennings, which explain the meanings of the names of the letters of the Ogham alphabet. The forfeda letter names and their kennings, as edited (in normalized Old Irish) and translated by McManus (1988), are as follows:

| Letter | | | Meaning | Bríatharogam; Morainn mac Moín | Bríatharogam; Maic ind Óc | Bríatharogam; Con Culainn |
| ᚕ | ea | Éabhadh | Unknown | snámchaín feda 'fair-swimming letter' | cosc lobair '[admonishing?] of an infirm person' | caínem éco 'fairest fish' |
| ᚖ | oi | Óir | 'Gold' | sruithem aicde 'most venerable substance' | lí crotha 'splendour of form' | |
| ᚗ | ui | Uilleann | 'Elbow' | túthmar fid 'fragrant tree' | cubat oll 'great elbow/cubit' | |
| ᚘ | p, later io | Ifín, earlier Pín | 'Spine/thorn'? | milsem fedo 'sweetest tree' | amram mlais 'most wonderful taste' | |
| ᚙ | ch or x, later ae | Eamhancholl | 'Twin-of-coll' | lúad sáethaig 'groan of a sick person' | mol galraig 'groan of a sick person' | |

Four of these names are glossed in the Auraicept with tree names, ebad as crithach "aspen", oir as feorus no edind "spindle-tree or ivy", uilleand as edleand "honeysuckle", and iphin as spinan no ispin "gooseberry or thorn".

The kennings for Éabhadh point to the sound éo or é, which is also the word for "salmon". The name appears modelled after Eadhadh and Iodhadh. The kennings for Ór point to the word ór "gold" (cognate to Latin aurum). The kenning of Uilleann, "great elbow", refers to the letter name. Since the Ogham alphabet dates to the Primitive Irish period, it had no sign for [p] in its original form and the letter Pín was added as a letter to express it. McManus states that the name Pín was probably influenced by Latin pinus ('pine'), but a more likely explanation is that it derives from Latin spina ('thorn'), as the kennings indicate a tree or shrub with sweet tasting fruit (therefore not a pine). According to Kelly (1976) the name spín (deriving from the Latin) appears in the Old Irish tree lists as meaning either gooseberry or thorn, so the medieval glosses may be correct on this occasion. The name Eamhancholl means "twinned coll", referring to the shape of the letter (ᚙ resembling two ᚉ), and also perhaps referring to its sound being similar to that of coll ([x] being a fricative variant of [k]). The Bríatharogam kenning "groan of a sick person" refers to a value ch [x], predating the decision that all five forfeda should represent vowels.

Apart from the first letter, the forfeda were little used in inscriptions, and this led later oghamists to rearrange them as a series of vowel diphthongs, necessitating a complete change to the sounds of Pín and Eamhancholl (the name Pín also had to be changed to Iphín). This arrangement is how they appear in most manuscripts:

- ᚕ (U+1695) Éabhadh: ea, éo ea;
- ᚖ (U+1696) Ór: oi óe, oi;
- ᚗ (U+1697) Uilleann: ui, úa, ui;
- ᚘ (U+1698) Ifín: io, ía, ia;
- ᚙ (U+1699) Eamhancholl: ae.

This arrangement meant that once again the ogham alphabet was without a letter for the [p] sound, making necessary the creation of Peith (see below).

=== Inscriptions ===
Apart from the first letter Éabhadh, the forfeda do not appear often in orthodox ogham inscriptions. Éabhadh was in fact frequently used as part of the formula word KOI ᚕᚑᚔ, but with the value /k/ or /x/. KOI means something like 'here' and is the ogham equivalent of the Latin hic iacet (McManus §5.3, 1991); it is etymologically linked with the Latin cis ("on this side"). It also appears with its vocalic value in later orthodox inscriptions however. Of the other forfeda the next three appear only a few times, and the last letter Eamhancholl does not appear at all. So rare are the other forfeda in inscriptions that it is worthwhile detailing the individual examples (numbering as given by Macalister):

- Óir appears twice:

- In an inscription in Killogrone in County Kerry (235), which reads:

᚛ᚐᚅᚋ ᚋᚖᚂᚓᚌᚖᚋᚏᚔᚇ ᚋᚐᚉᚔ ᚍᚓᚉᚒᚋᚓᚅ᚜
ANM MÓLEGÓMRID MACI VECUMEN

- In a late inscription on a cross slab at Formaston in Aberdeenshire, which reads:

᚛ᚋᚐᚊᚊᚖ ᚈᚐᚂᚂᚒᚑᚏᚏᚆ ᚅᚓᚆᚆᚈᚍ ᚏᚑᚁᚁᚐᚉ ᚉᚓᚅᚅᚓᚃᚃ᚜
MAQQÓ TALLUORRH NÉHHTV ROBBAC CÉNNEFF

- Uilleann appears only once, in an inscription in Teeromoyle, again in County Kerry (240). The inscription reads:

᚛ᚋᚑᚉᚒᚏᚏᚓᚈᚔ ᚋᚐᚊᚔ ᚍᚂᚔᚄᚐᚉᚓᚄᚗᚉᚋᚔᚏ᚜
MOCURRETI MAQI VLISACESUICMIR

- Pín appears in two, or possibly three, inscriptions.

- In Cool East on Valencia Island in County Kerry (231), which reads:

᚛ᚂᚑᚌᚔᚈᚈᚔ ᚋᚐᚊᚔ ᚓᚏᚘᚓᚅ᚜
LOGITTI MAQI ERPENN

The letter [p] appears as an X shape instead of the 'double X' shape of the letter, presumably because the correct letter shape is quite hard to carve.

- In Crickowel in Breconshire in Wales (327) which reads:

᚛ᚈᚒᚏᚘᚔᚂᚔ ᚋᚑᚄᚐᚉ ᚈᚏᚐᚂᚂᚑᚅᚔ᚜
TURPILI MOSAC TRALLONI

Again an X shape is used.

- In Margam in Glamorganshire in Wales (409) which reads:

᚛ᚘᚐᚋᚘᚓᚄ᚜
PAMPES

However, much of the inscription is broken off and what remains looks like a squat arrowhead. It almost certainly stands for [p] however, as the ogham inscription is accompanied by one in Latin which confirms the sound.

== Other forfeda ==
Beyond the five forfeda discussed above, which doubtlessly date to Old Irish times, there is a large number of letter variants and symbols, partly found in manuscripts, and partly in "scholastic" (post 6th century) inscriptions collectively termed forfeda. They may date to Old Irish, Middle Irish or even early modern times.

=== Peith ===
Due to the "schematicism of later Ogamists" (McManus 1988:167), who insisted on treating the five primary forfeda as vowels, [p] had again to be expressed as a modification of [b], called peithe, after beithe, also called beithe bog "soft beithe" or, tautologically, peithbog (ᚚ Peith, Unicode allocation U+169A).

=== Manuscript tradition ===
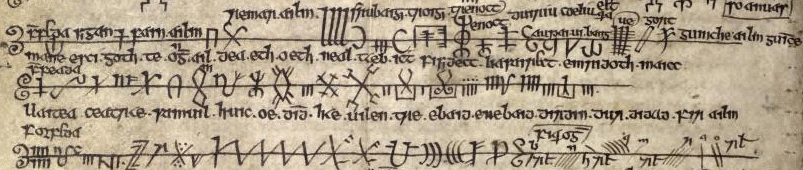
The forfeda of the Ogham scales in the Book of Ballymote (scale nrs. 79, 80, 81)

The 7th-12th century Auraicept na n-Éces among the 92 "variants" of the Ogham script gives more letters identified as forfeda (variant nrs. 79, 80 and 81).

=== Inscriptions ===
The Bressay stone in Shetland (CISP BREAY/1) contains five forfeda, three of them paralleled on other Scottish monuments and also in Irish manuscripts, and two unique to Bressay. One of the latter is possibly a correction of an error in carving and not intended as a forfid. One is "rabbit-eared", interpreted as some kind of modified D, presumably the voiced spirant. Another is an "angled vowel", presumably a modified A. One unique character consists of five undulating strokes sloping backwards across the stem, possibly a modified I. The fourth is a four-stroke cross-hatching, also appearing in the late eighth or ninth-century Bern ogham alphabet and syllabary under a label which has previously been read as RR, but another suggestions is SS. It appears in the Book of Ballymote, scale no. 64.CISP - BREAY/1
