= Fearn (letter) =

Letter of the Ogham alphabet

Fearn (ᚃ) is the Irish name of the third letter (Irish "letter": sing.fid, pl.feda) of the Ogham alphabet, meaning "alder-tree". In Old Irish, the letter name was fern [fʲern̪], which is related to Welsh: gwern(en), meaning "alder-tree(s)". Its Primitive Irish root was *wernā and its phonetic value then was [w]. Its Old Irish and modern phonetic value is [f].

== Interpretation ==
The kennings unambiguously point to alder as the meaning of this letter name, from the wood's use in shields and milk vessels. The Auraicept na n-Éces explains:

Fern (f) that is, alder in the forest...Airenach fían, i.e., shield of warrior-bands, i.e., shield [is his kenning] for [the letter] fern, f, owing to their redness alike, or because the alder, the material of the shield was from the alder-tree given to the Ogham letter which has taken a name from it... Comét lachta, guarding of milk, to wit, that is the Ogham [called] Fern, f, from alder of the forests, for it is it that guards the milk, for of it are made the vessels containing the milk.

The "redness alike" here refers to a property of alder wood that, when cut, turns from white to blood-red, another reason for the tree's association with warriors. As well as alder-wood Bronze Age and early Iron Age shields, several alder-wood containers and bowls have been retrieved. The archaeological record confirms the uses of the wood described in the kennings.

== Bríatharogaim ==
In the medieval kennings, called Bríatharogaim (sing. Bríatharogam) or Word Oghams, the verses associated with Fearn are:

airenach fían: "vanguard of warriors" in the Bríatharogam Morann mic Moín

comét lachta: "milk container" in the Bríatharogam Mac ind Óc

dín cridi: "protection of the heart" in the Bríatharogam Con Culainn.

== Notes ==
While medieval and modern neopagan arboreal glosses (i.e. tree names) for the Ogham have been widely popularised (even for feda whose names do not translate as trees), the Old Irish In Lebor Ogaim (the Ogam Tract) also lists many other word values classified by type (e.g. birds, occupations, companies) for each fid. The filí (Old Irish filid, sing.fili), or poets, of this period learned around one hundred and fifty variants of Ogham during their training, including these word-list forms.

Some of the notable values of these for fearn include:

Enogam/Bird-ogam: faelinn "gull"

Dathogam/Colour-ogam: flann "blood-red"

Ogam tirda/Agricultural ogam: fidba "hedge-bill"

Danogam/Art-ogam: filideacht "poetry"

Ogam Cuidechtach/Company Ogam: Fianna "Warriors"
