= Eadhadh =

Letter of the Ogham alphabet

Eadhadh is the Irish name of the nineteenth letter of the Ogham alphabet, ᚓ. In Old Irish, the letter name was Edad. Its phonetic value is [e]. The original meaning of the letter name is unknown, but it is likely an artificially altered pairing with Idad, much like Gothic pairþra, qairþra.

== Interpretation ==
The kennings for this letter value are quite cryptic. Medieval "arboreal" glossators assign crand fir no crithach "'true tree' or aspen" (Crann Creathach in modern Irish) to this letter, though this has little to recommend it by way of either the kennings or the etymology.

McManus suggests an original value of Primitive Irish *eburas, from the Proto-Celtic *eburo- probably originally meaning "rowan". This is the root of the Old Irish ibar which refers (with qualifications) to a number of different evergreen trees. He makes sense of the kennings for edad in relation to its pairing with idad. Given éo as the likely Old Irish word for "yew tree" (see idad) and the variant forms of Old Irish é/éo "salmon", we can understand the "exchange of friends" kenning; at the time the kenning was constructed this would have been understood as a word play involving exchange of meaning between the paired edad (é/éo salmon because of the value of the letter [e]) and idad (éo yew). Medieval glossators on edad also suggested a connection to the discerning 'Salmon of Wisdom'.

McManus also suggests that "brother of birch" may be a kenning erroneously displaced to the penultimate of the original twenty letters, from the penultimate forfeda which had an original letter name pín [p] that when changed later to ifín necessitated the invention of peithe [p] also called beithe bog "soft beithe", hence "brother of birch". This is informed conjecture, however, and will probably not be resolved unless a full complement of kennings from the Con Culainn tradition is ever discovered (at present their values for many of the forfeda for that tradition are unattested). It could also simply be that beithe is to peithe (a rhyming pair of ogham letters) as edad is to idad, and that edad is brother of beithe for this reason.

== Bríatharogam ==
In the medieval kennings, called Bríatharogaim or Word Ogham the verses associated with edad are:

érgnaid fid - "discerning tree/chap" in the Bríatharogam Morann mic Moín

commaín carat - "exchange of friends" in the Bríatharogam Mac ind Óc

bráthair bethi (?) - "brother of birch (?)" in the Bríatharogam Con Culainn.
