= Beith (letter) =

Letter of the Ogham alphabet

Beith (ᚁ) is the Irish name of the first letter (Irish "letter": sing.fid, pl.feda) of the Ogham alphabet, meaning "birch". In Old Irish, the letter name was Beithe, which is related to Welsh bedw(en), Breton bezv(enn), and Latin betula. Its Proto-Indo-European root was *gʷet- 'resin, gum'. Its phonetic value is [b].

== Interpretation ==
The Auraicept na n-Éces contains the tale of the mythological origins of Beith

This moreover is the first thing that was written by Ogham, [illustration of seven b's, in Ogham script] i.e. (the birch) b was written, and to convey a warning to Lug son of Ethliu it was written respecting his wife lest she should be carried away from him into faeryland, to wit, seven b’s in one switch of birch: Thy wife will be seven times carried away from thee into faeryland or into another country, unless birch guard her. On that account, moreover, b, birch, takes precedence, for it is in birch that Ogham was first written.

Peith (ᚚ) is a later addition to the Forfeda, a variant of Beith with a phonetic value of [p]. It is also called beithe bog "soft beithe", [p] being considered a "soft" variant of [b]. It replaced Ifín ᚘ, one of the "original" five Forfeda likely named initially pín (influenced by Latin pinus) with an original value [p] but whose phonetic value was altered to a vowel diphthong due to later medieval schematicism.

== Bríatharogaim ==
In the medieval kennings, called Bríatharogaim (sing. Bríatharogam) or Word Oghams the verses associated with Beith are:

Féocos foltchaín: "Withered foot with fine hair" in the Bríatharogam Morann mic Moín

Glaisem cnis: "Greyest of skin" in the Bríatharogam Mac ind Óc

Maise malach: "Beauty of the eyebrow" in the Bríatharogam Con Culainn.

== Notes ==
While medieval and modern neopagan arboreal glosses (i.e. tree names) for the Ogham have been widely popularised (even for fade whose names do not translate as trees), the Old Irish In Lebor Ogaim (the Ogam Tract) also lists many other word values classified by type (e.g. birds, occupations, companies) for each fid. The filí (Old Irish filid, sing. fili) or poets of this period learned around one hundred and fifty variants of Ogham during their training, including these word-list forms.

Some of the notable Old Irish values of these for Beith include:

Enogam/Bird-ogam: besan "pheasant?" (this translation may be incorrect as the text predates the approximately sixteenth century introduction of pheasants to Ireland)

Dathogam/Colour-ogam: bán "white"

Ogam tirda/Agricultural ogam: biail "axe"

Danogam/Art-ogam: bethumnacht "livelihood"

Ogam Cuidechtach/Company Ogam: Bachlaid "Priests"

== See also ==
- Berkanan
