= Ailm =

Letter of the Ogham alphabet

Ailm is the Irish name of the sixteenth letter of the Ogham alphabet, ᚐ. Its phonetic value is [a]. The original meaning of the name cannot be established with certainty. The Bríatharogam kennings all refer to the sound [a] and not to the meaning of the letter name, either as the sound of a "groan", or to the Irish vocative particle, á. Thurneysen suggests that Ailm, Beithe was influenced by Alpha, Beta. However, beithe is an Irish word, and there is no reason to consider ailm a sole, loaned letter name among the original feda; Thurneysen did not suggest this letter name involved such a borrowing. The word is attested once outside of the Ogham grammatical texts, in the poem "King Henry and the Hermit",

caine ailmi ardom-peitet

which translates to

Beautiful are the pines which make music for me.

This single reference is the reason ailm is sometimes associated with pines. However, the poem likely post-dates origins of the medieval tradition of arboreal glosses of the ogham letters, so is more probably influenced by this tradition than an independent source for the meaning of ailm.

== Bríatharogam ==
In the medieval kennings, called Bríatharogaim or Word Ogham the verses associated with ailm are:

- ardam íachta – "loudest groan" in the Bríatharogam Morann mic Moín
- tosach frecrai – "beginning of an answer" in the Bríatharogam Mac ind Óc
- tosach garmae – "beginning of calling" in the Bríatharogam Con Culainn.
