= NGéadal =

Letter of the Ogham alphabet

nGéadal (Ngéadal or Ngeadal) is the Irish name of the thirteenth letter of the Ogham alphabet, ᚍ.

The Bríatharogam (kennings) for the letter are:

- lúth lego "sustenance of a leech"
- étiud midach "raiment of physicians"
- tosach n-échto "beginning of slaying"

Its meaning is probably "[the act of] wounding". In Old Irish, the letter name was Gétal. It may be a verbal noun of gonid 'wounds, slays'. in which case is related to Welsh gwanu 'to pierce, to stab', which comes from the root was *gʷhen- 'to pierce, to strike'. Its original phonetic value in Primitive Irish was [ɡʷ], the voiced labiovelar. In Old Irish, this phoneme merged with g (gort), and the medieval manuscript tradition assigns it Latin ng [ŋ], hence the unetymological spelling of the letter name with initial n-.
