= Sail (letter) =

Letter of the Ogham alphabet

Sail or Saille (ᚄ) is the Irish name of the fourth letter (Irish "letter": sing.fid, pl.feda) of the Ogham alphabet, meaning "willow". The name is related to Welsh helyg(en) and Latin salix. Its Proto-Indo-European root was *sal- meaning "dirty, grey". Its phonetic value is [s].

== Interpretation ==
The etymology and kennings unambiguously confirm the meaning "willow" for this letter name. The Morann mic Moín kenning is a reference to the sallow grey appearance of the bark of this tree, while the kennings referencing bees and honey are due to its being commonly pollinated by bees.

== Bríatharogaim ==
In the medieval kennings, called Bríatharogaim (sing. Bríatharogam) or Word Oghams the verses associated with sail are:

lí ambi: "pallor of a lifeless one" in the Bríatharogam Morann mic Moín

lúth bech: "sustenance of bees" in the Bríatharogam Mac ind Óc

tosach mela: "beginning of honey" in the Bríatharogam Con Culainn.

== Notes ==
While medieval and modern neopagan arboreal glosses (i.e. tree names) for the Ogham have been widely popularised (even for feda whose names do not translate as trees), the Old Irish In Lebor Ogaim (the Ogam Tract) also lists many other word values classified by type (e.g. birds, occupations, companies) for each fid. The filí (Old Irish filid, sing. fili) or poets of this period learned around one hundred and fifty variants of Ogham during their training, including these word-list forms.

Some of the notable values of these for sail include:

Enogam/Bird-ogam: seg "hawk"

Dathogam/Colour-ogam: sodath "fine-coloured"

Ogam tirda/Agricultural ogam: srathar "pack saddle"

Danogam/Art-ogam:sairsi "handicraft"

Ogam Cuidechtach/Company Ogam: Senada "Synods"
