= Ceirt =

Letter of the Ogham alphabet

Ceirt (Queirt) ᚊ (Primitive Irish cert) is a letter of the Ogham alphabet, transcribed as Q. It expresses the Primitive Irish labiovelar phoneme. The 14th century Auraicept na n-Éces glosses the name as aball, meaning "apple tree". Its phonetic value is [kʷ].

The Bríatharogam (kennings) for the letter are:

- Morainn mac Moín: Clithar baiscill ‘the shelter of a lunatic’
- Maic ind Óc: Bríg anduini ‘substance of an insignificant person’
- Con Culainn: Dígu fethail ‘dregs of clothing’

McManus (1991:37) compares it to Welsh perth ‘thorn bush’, Latin quercus ‘oak’ (PIE *perkwos); it survives in the Modern Irish ceirtlis ("cider"). The name was confused with Old Irish ceirt ‘rag’, reflected in the kennings.

In the framework of a runic origin of the Ogham, the name has also been compared to the name of the Anglo Saxon Futhorc p-rune, Peorð: This name is itself unclear, but most often identified as ‘pear’, a meaning not unrelated to ‘apple’. The p letter of the Gothic alphabet has a cognate name, pairþra, alongside the clearly related qairþra, the name for the Gothic labiovelar. Since an influence of Ogham letter names on Gothic letter names is eminently unlikely, it seems most probable that the Proto-Germanic p rune had a meaning of ‘pear tree’ (*pera-trewô?), continued in the Anglo-Saxon peorð rune (with the meaning of the name forgotten), and was introduced into 4th century Ireland as the name of a rune named after a pear or apple tree. As p was nonexistent as a phoneme in Primitive Irish, the p and q runes would have been considered equivalent.
