= Uath =

Letter of the Ogham alphabet

Uath, Old Irish Úath, hÚath (Old Irish pronunciation: [uːəθ]), is the sixth letter of the Ogham alphabet, ᚆ, transcribed ⟨ʜ⟩ in manuscript tradition, but unattested in actual inscriptions. The kenning "a meet of hounds is huath" identifies the name as úath "horror, fear", although the Auraicept glosses "white-thorn":

comdal cuan huath (.i. sce L. om); no ar is uathmar hi ara deilghibh "a meet of hounds is huath (i.e. white-thorn); or because it is formidable (uathmar) for its thorns."

The original etymology of the name, and the letter's value, are, however, unclear. McManus (1986) suggested a value /y/ (i.e. the semivowel [j]). Peter Schrijver suggested that if úath "fear" is cognate with Latin pavere, a trace of PIE *p might have survived into Primitive Irish, but there is no independent evidence for this.

== Bríatharogam ==
In the medieval kennings, called Bríatharogam or Word Ogham the verses associated with Úath are:

condál cúan - "assembly of packs of hounds" in the Word Ogham of Morann mic Moín

bánad gnúise - "blanching of faces" in the Word Ogham of Mac ind Óc

ansam aidche - "most difficult at night"" in the Word Ogham of Culainn.
