= Onn (disambiguation) =

Onn is the Irish name of the seventeenth letter of the Ogham alphabet.

Onn or ONN may also refer to:

- Optical neural network
- Oscillatory neural network
- Onion News Network
- ONN (radio), the Ohio News Network
- Onn Abu Bakar, a Malaysian politician
- Onn Jaafar, a Malayan politician
- Onn Hafiz Ghazi, a Malaysian politician
- Melanie Onn, a British politician
- Shmuel Onn, a mathematician
- Onn, a Walmart store brand of consumer electronics
- The Festival City of Onn, a later name for Arrakeen, capital of Arrakis in Frank Herbert's novel God Emperor of Dune
