= Bríatharogam =

Irish-language poetry

In early Irish literature, a Bríatharogam ("word ogham", plural Bríatharogaim) is a two-word kenning which explains the meanings of the names of the letters of the Ogham alphabet. Three variant lists of bríatharogaim or "word-oghams" have been preserved, dating to the Old Irish period. They are as follows:

- Bríatharogam Morainn mac Moín
- Bríatharogam Maic ind Óc
- Bríatharogam Con Culainn

The first two of these are attested from all three surviving copies of the Ogam Tract, while the "Cú Chulainn" version is not in the Book of Ballymote and only known from 16th- and 17th-century manuscripts. The Auraicept na n-Éces or 'Scholars' Primer' reports and interprets the Bríatharogam Morainn mac Moín.

Later Medieval scholars believed that all of the letter names were those of trees, and attempted to explain the bríatharogaim in that light. However, modern scholarship has shown that only eight at most of the letter names are those of trees, and that the word-oghams or kennings themselves support this. The kennings as edited (in normalized Old Irish) and translated by McManus (1988) are as follows:

Letter			Meaning	Bríatharogam Morainn mac Moín	Bríatharogam Maic ind Óc	Bríatharogam Con Culainn
ᚁ	B	Beithe	'Birch'	féochos foltchain "withered foot with fine hair"	glaisem cnis "greyest of skin"	maise malach "beauty of the eyebrow"
ᚂ	L	Luis	'Flame' or 'Herb'	lí súla "lustre of the eye"	carae cethrae "friend of cattle"	lúth cethrae "sustenance of cattle"
ᚃ	F	Fern	'Alder'	airenach fían "vanguard of warriors"	comét lachta "milk container"	dín cridi "protection of the heart"
ᚄ	S	Sail	'Willow'	lí ambi "pallor of a lifeless one"	lúth bech "sustenance of bees"	tosach mela "beginning of honey"
ᚅ	N	Nin	'Branch-fork'	costud síde "establishing of peace"	bág ban "boast of women"	bág maise "boast of beauty"
ᚆ	H	Úath	'Fear'	condál cúan "assembly of packs of hounds"	bánad gnúise "blanching of faces"	ansam aidche "most difficult at night"
ᚇ	D	Dair	'Oak'	ardam dosae "highest tree"	grés soír "handicraft of a craftsman"	slechtam soíre "most carved of craftsmanship"
ᚈ	T	Tinne	'Iron Bar'	trian roith "one of three parts of a wheel"	smiur gúaile "marrow of (char)coal"	trian n-airm "one of three parts of a weapon"
ᚉ	C	Coll	'Hazel'	caíniu fedaib "fairest tree"	carae blóesc "friend of nutshells"	milsem fedo "sweetest tree"
ᚊ	Q	Cert	'Bush' or 'Rag'	clithar baiscill "shelter of a [lunatic?]"	bríg anduini "substance of an insignificant person"	dígu fethail "dregs of clothing"
ᚋ	M	Muin	'Neck', 'Ruse/Trick' or 'Love'	tressam fedmae "strongest in exertion"	árusc n-airlig "proverb of slaughter"	conar gotha "path of the voice"
ᚌ	G	Gort	'Field'	milsiu féraib "sweetest grass"	ined erc "suitable place for cows"	sásad ile "sating of multitudes"
ᚍ	GG	Gétal	'Slaying'	lúth lego "sustenance of a leech"	étiud midach "raiment of physicians"	tosach n-échto "beginning of slaying"
ᚎ	Z	Straif	'Sulphur'	tressam rúamnai "strongest reddening (dye)"	mórad rún "increase of secrets"	saigid nél "seeking of clouds"
ᚏ	R	Ruis	'Red'	tindem rucci "most intense blushing"	rúamnae drech "reddening of faces"	bruth fergae "glow of anger"
ᚐ	A	Ailm	'Pine'?	ardam íachta "loudest groan"	tosach frecrai "beginning of an answer"	tosach garmae "beginning of calling"
ᚑ	O	Onn	'Ash-tree'	congnaid ech "wounder of horses"	féthem soíre "smoothest of craftsmanship"	lúth fían "[equipment] of warrior bands"
ᚒ	U	Úr	'Earth'	úaraib adbaib "in cold dwellings"	sílad cland "propagation of plants"	forbbaid ambí "shroud of a lifeless one"
ᚓ	E	Edad	'Aspen' (modern Irish Eabhadh, Eadha)	érgnaid fid "discerning tree"	commaín carat "exchange of friends"	bráthair bethi (?) "brother of birch" (?)
ᚔ	I	Idad	'Yew-tree'?	sinem fedo "oldest tree"	caínem sen "fairest of the ancients"	lúth lobair (?) "energy of an infirm person" (?)
ᚕ	EA	Ébad	Unknown	snámchaín feda "fair-swimming letter"	cosc lobair "[admonishing?] of an infirm person"	caínem éco "fairest fish"
ᚖ	OI	Óir	'Gold'	sruithem aicde "most venerable substance"	lí crotha "splendour of form"	
ᚗ	UI	Uillenn	'Elbow'	túthmar fid "fragrant tree"	cubat oll "great elbow/cubit"	
ᚘ	IO	Iphín	'Spine/thorn'?	milsem fedo "sweetest tree"	amram mlais "most wonderful taste"	
ᚙ	AE	Emancholl	'Twin-of-hazel'	lúad sáethaig "groan of a sick person"	mol galraig "groan of a sick person"	

- beithe means "birch-tree", cognate to Latin betula. The kenning in the Auraicept is
  Feocos foltchain in beithi "of withered trunk fairhaired the birch"
- luis is either related to luise "blaze" or lus "herb". The kenning
  Li sula luis (.i. caertheand) ar ailleacht a caer "[delightful] for eye is luis (i.e. rowan) owing to the beauty of its berries"

the kenning "for the eye is luis" would support a meaning of "blaze".

- fern means "alder-tree", Primitive Irish *wernā, so that the original value of the letter was [w]. The kenning is
  Airenach Fiann (.i. fernd) air is di na sgeith "the van of the warrior-bands (i.e. alder), for thereof are the shields"
- sail means "willow-tree", cognate to Latin salix, with the kenning
  Li ambi .i. nemli lais .i. ar cosmaillius a datha fri marb "the colour of a lifeless one, i.e. it has no colour, i.e. owing to the resemblance of its hue of a dead person"
- nin means either "fork" or "loft". The Auraicept glosses it as uinnius "ash-tree",

cosdad sida nin .i. uinnius, ar is di doniter craind gae triasa "A check on peace is nin (i.e. ash), for of it are made spear-shafts by which the peace is broken"

- úath is unattested in inscriptions. The kenning "a meet of hounds is huath" identifies the name as úath "horror, fear", although the Auraicept glosses "white-thorn":
  comdal cuan huath (.i. sce L. om); no ar is uathmar hi ara deilghibh "a meet of hounds is huath (i.e. white-thorn); or because it is formidable (uathmar) for its thorns."

The original etymology of the name, and the letter's value, are however unclear. McManus (1986) suggested a value [y]. Linguist Peter Schrijver suggested that if úath "fear" is cognate with Latin pavere, a trace of PIE *p might have survived into Primitive Irish, but there is no independent evidence for this. (see McManus 1991:37)

- dair means "oak" (PIE *doru-).
  arirde dossaib duir "higher than bushes is an oak"
- tinne from the evidence of the kennings means "bar of metal, ingot". The Auraicept equates it with "holly"
  trian roith tindi L .i. ar is cuileand in tres fidh roith in carbait "a third of a wheel is tinne, that is, because holly is one of the three timbers of the chariot-wheel"

the word is probably cognate to Old Irish tend "strong" or tind "brilliant".

- coll meant "hazel-tree", cognate with Welsh collen, correctly glossed as cainfidh "fair-wood" ("hazel"),
  coll .i. cach ac ithi a chno "coll, i.e. every one is eating from its nuts"
- cert is cognate with Welsh pert "bush", Latin quercus "oak" (PIE *perkwos). It was confused with Old Irish ceirt "rag", reflected in the kennings. The Auraicept glosses aball "apple",
  clithar boaiscille .i. elit gelt quert (.i. aball) "shelter of a boiscill, i.e. a wild hind is queirt, i.e. an apple tree"
- muin: the kennings connect this name to three different words, muin "neck, upper part of the back", muin "wile, ruse", and muin "love, esteem". The Auraicept glosses finemhain "vine", with a kenning consistent with "love":
  airdi masi muin .i. iarsinni fhasas a n-airde .i. finemhain "highest of beauty is min, i.e. because it grows aloft, i.e. a vine-tree"
- gort means "field" (cognate to garden). The Auraicept glosses "ivy":
  glaisiu geltaibh gort (.i. edind) "greener than pastures is gort (i.e. "ivy")."
- gétal from the kennings has a meaning of "killing", maybe cognate to gonid "slays", from PIE *gwen-. The value of the letter in Primitive Irish, then, was a voiced labiovelar, [g^{w}]. The Auraicept glosses cilcach, "broom" or "fern":
  luth lega getal (.i. cilcach) no raith "a leech's sustenance is getal (i.e. broom)."
- straiph means "sulphur". The Primitive Irish letter value is uncertain, it may have been a sibilant different from s, which is taken by sail, maybe a reflex of /st/ or /sw/. The Auraicept glosses draighin "blackthorn":
  aire srabha sraibh (.i. draighin) "the hedge of a stream is sraibh (i.e. blackthorn)."
- ruis means "red" or "redness", glossed as trom "elder":
  ruamma ruice ruis (.i. trom) "the redness of shame is ruis (i.e. elder)"
- ailm is of uncertain meaning, possibly "pine-tree". The Auraicept has crand giuis .i. ochtach, "fir-tree" or "pinetree"
- onn means "ash-tree", although the Auraicept glosses aiten "furze",
- úr, based on the kennings, means "earth, clay, soil". The Auraicept glosses fraech "heath".
- edad and idhad are paired names of unknown meaning, although idhad may be a form of 'yew-tree', altered to make a pairing. The Auraicept glosses them as ed uath .i. crand fir no crithach "horrible grief, i.e. test-tree or aspen", and ibhar "yew", respectively.

Of the forfeda, four are glossed by the Auraicept, ebhadh with crithach "aspen", oir with feorus no edind "spindle-tree or ivy", uilleand with edleand "honeysuckle", and iphin with spinan no ispin "gooseberry or thorn".
