= Iodhadh =

Letter of the Ogham alphabet

Iodhadh is the Irish name of the twentieth letter of the Ogham alphabet, ᚔ. In Old Irish, the letter name was idad. Its phonetic value is [i]. The original meaning of the letter name is uncertain, but it is likely an artificially altered pair with edad, much like Gothic pairþra, qairþra, and may refer to "yew".

== Interpretation ==
The medieval glossators all assign "yew" as the meaning of the letter name referred to by the kennings, though Idad is not a word attested in its own right. Idad as "yew" is glossed by these later commentators as deriving from a modified form of ibar originally. However, this is unlikely to be the Old Irish word that gave the letter its value of "yew", as the cognate Welsh efwr and Gallo-Roman eburos point to a Primitive Irish *eburas, and ibar was used (with qualifiers) to refer to a whole range of evergreen shrubs.

It is more likely that the Old Irish word that gave the letter its ascribed meaning was éo, from the Primitive Irish *iwas (cf. Welsh ywen, Gaulish ivo-, Proto-Indo-European *iwo- "yew"). McManus suggests that the original letter names for edad and idad were likely *eburas (or *esox) and *iwas, hence their values [e] and [i] respectively, with confusion arising in the medieval period as the language evolved.

== Bríatharogam ==
In the medieval kennings, called Bríatharogaim or Word Ogham the verses associated with idad are:

sinem fedo - "oldest tree" in the Bríatharogam Morann mic Moín

caínem sen - "fairest of the ancients" in the Bríatharogam Mac ind Óc

lúth lobair (?) - "energy of an infirm person (?)" in the Bríatharogam Con Culainn.
