= Dair =

Letter of the Ogham alphabet

Dair is the Irish name of the seventh letter of the Ogham alphabet, ᚇ, meaning "oak". The Old Irish: dair (Early Old Irish: daur) is related to Welsh derw(en) and to Breton derv(enn). Its Proto-Indo-European root was *dóru ("tree"), possibly a deadjectival noun of *deru-, *drew- ("hard, firm, strong, solid"). Its phonetic value is [d].

Dair forms the basis of some first names in Irish Gaelic such as Daire, Dara, Darragh and Daragh.

== Bríatharogam ==
In the medieval kennings, called Bríatharogam or Word Ogham the verses associated with Dair are:

ardam dosae - "highest tree" in the Word Ogham of Morann mic Moín

grés soír - "handicraft of a craftsman" in the Word Ogham of Mac ind Óc

slechtam soíre - "most carved of craftsmanship" in the Word Ogham of Culainn.
