= Peorð =

Rune

Name	Proto-Germanic	Old English
Name	*Perþō^{?}	Peorð/Peorþ
Name	type of wood?	type of wooden product?
Shape	Elder Futhark	Futhorc
Unicode	ᛈ U+16C8	
Transliteration	p	
Transcription	p	
IPA	[p]	
Position in rune-row	14 b	

ᛈ is a rune denoting the sound p (voiceless bilabial stop) in the Germanic Elder Futhark and the Anglo-Saxon Futhorc writing systems. It does not appear in the Norse Younger Futhark writing systems.

== Etymology ==
The only attested name for the rune is the Old English name of peorð (also written peorþ), of unknown meaning. No word similar to peorð is known in Old English. In the Anglo-Saxon rune-poem its meaning is glossed as follows:

- ᛈ peorð bẏþ sẏmble pleġa and hlehter
- ƿlancum [on middum], ðar ƿigan sittaþ
- on beorsele blīþe ætsomne

Translation:

- ᛈ Peorð beeth always playing and laughter
- proud [in middle], there warriors sit
- in beer-hall joyously united.

The sole manuscript recording the poem, Cotton Otho B.x, was destroyed in the 1731 fire at the Cotton library, and all editions of the poems are based on a facsimile published by George Hickes in 1705. Hickes also made a copy of the runological manuscript Cotton MS Domitian A IX, which has survived. Comparing the original to Hickes' copy reveals mistakes, casting some doubt on the accuracy of Hickes' published rune poems.

Analog or related names may exist in other alphabets. According to a 9th-century manuscript (Codex Vindobonensis 795), the letter p of the Gothic alphabet 𐍀 (based on the Greek Pi Π) is called pertra. When reconstructed to earlier period Gothic, the name becomes *paírþra, which could be related to peorð, but its meaning is similarly unknown. Coincidentally, the Dalecarlian rune name for p was documented by Johannes Bureus as the similarly formed pir.

From peorð, the Proto-Germanic form *perðu, *perþō or *perþaz may be reconstructed on purely phonological grounds. The Common Germanic name could be referring to a pear-tree (or perhaps generally a fruit-tree). The expected Proto-Germanic term for "pear tree" would be *pera-trewô (*pera being, however, a post-Proto-Germanic loan, either West Germanic, or Common Germanic, if Gothic *paírþra meant "pear tree", from Vulgar Latin pirum (plural pira), itself of unknown origin). The Ogham letter name Ceirt, glossed as "apple tree", may in turn be a loan from Germanic into Primitive Irish.

Based on the context of "recreation and amusement" given in the rune poem, a speculative interpretation is that the intended meaning is "pear-wood" as the material of either a woodwind instrument, or a "game box" or game pieces made from wood. A similar material theme is found in the Nordic rune poems for the rune ᛒ (Swedish rune name: birke, "birch grove/lumber").

Jackson Crawford sees a potential link between the Anglo-Saxon rune names for ᛢ (q) and ᛈ (p) in comparison to their Gothic analogs:

Letter		Anglo-Saxon	Gothic
P	ᛈ	peorð	pertra	(*paírþra)
Q	ᛢ	cweorð	quertra	(*qaírþra)

These may be borrowings from Celtic tree names originally, and then maybe byforms of one root form for a certain type of tree.

== History ==
=== Origin ===
The glyph of ᛈ doesnt directly correspond to any western letter before it; however, since the vast majority of Elder Runes derive from Old Italic scripts, it can be assumed that ᛈ derives its shape from the root of Greek Pi Π. Corresponding forms are attested in Old Italic scripts: cf. Camunic (/p/). The glyph appears to have been flipped on its side to differentiate it from e ᛖ (Epsilon derivative: Ε → E → Σ), with its bistaves creased to conform with woodcarving principles (where perpendicular cuts are avoided to not disappear into the fibre).

Π	→	Π	→	ᛈ

Looijenga (1997) speculates that the p rune arose as a variant of the b rune, parallel to the secondary nature of Ogham peith. The uncertainty surrounding the rune is a consequence of the rarity of the *p phoneme in Proto-Germanic.

=== Usage ===
The rune was in use with both the 24-type Pan-Germanic Elder Futhark (1st–8th c.), and the successive 28-type and 32-type Anglo-Saxon Futhorc (6th–12th c.).

The earliest attestation of the rune is in the Kylver Stone futhark row (ca. AD 400). The earliest example in a linguistic context (as opposed to an abecedarium) is already in futhorc, in the Kent II, III and IV coin inscriptions (the personal names pada and æpa/epa), dated to ca. AD 700. On St. Cuthbert's coffin (AD 698), a p rune takes the place of Greek Ρ. The Westeremden yew-stick (ca. AD 750) has op hæmu "at home" and up duna "on the hill".

In Proto-Norse runic tradition, the rune starts falling out of use around the 6–7th century, and is eventually discontinued upon adoption of the Younger Futhark, which expresses /p/ with the b rune, for example on the Viking Age Skarpåker Stone:

iarþ sal rifna uk ubhimin
Jörð skal rifna ok upphiminn.
"Earth shall be rent, and the heavens above."

A new Norse p-rune eventually emerged as the ᛔ (stung ᛒ), later simplified as ᛕ (open ᛒ). In the late 16th century, an angular trident-shaped p-rune 𐋐 had been adopted in the Dalecarlian runic alphabet.

== See also ==
- Runic alphabet
- Rune poem
- Gothic alphabet
- Ogham
