= Tinne (letter) =

Letter of the Ogham alphabet

Tinne is the Irish name of the eighth letter of the Ogham alphabet, ᚈ, meaning "ingot" or "iron bar". Its phonetic value is [t].

== Bríatharogam ==
In the medieval kennings, called Bríatharogam or Word Ogham the verses associated with Tinne are:

trian roith - "one of three parts of a wheel" in the Word Ogham of Morann mic Moín

smiur gúaile - "marrow of (char)coal" in the Word Ogham of Mac ind Óc

trian n-airm - "one of three parts of a weapon" in the Word Ogham of Culainn.
