= Ifín =

Letter of the Ogham alphabet

Ifín ᚘ (also spelled iphin) is one of the forfeda, the "additional" letters of the Ogham alphabet. Its sound value according to the Auraicept na n-Éces, De dúilib feda and In Lebor Ogaim, are io, ía, and ia, respectively. The Auraincept glosses the name according to the "arboreal" tradition as spinan no ispin "gooseberry or thorn". The letter's invention dates to the Old Irish period, several centuries after the peak of Ogham usage. Since the Ogham alphabet dates to the Primitive Irish period, it had no sign for [p] in its original form. Ifín may originally have been added as a letter expressing [p], called Pín (probably influenced by Latin pinus). Due to the "schematicism of later Ogamists" (McManus 1988:167), who insisted on treating the five primary forfeda as vowels, [p] had again to be expressed as a modification of [b], called Peithe, after Beithe, also called beithe bog "soft beithe" or, tautologically, peithbog, and the earlier letter designed to express p was renamed to i-phín, and considered as expressing an i- diphthong.

== Unicode ==
Both Ifín and Peith have Unicode allocations:

- Ifín ᚘ U+1698
- Peith ᚚ U+169A
