= Muin (letter) =

Letter of the Ogham alphabet

Muin (ᚋ) is the eleventh letter of the Ogham alphabet. Its phonetic value is [m].

== Bríatharogam ==
In the medieval kennings, called Bríatharogaim or Word Ogham the verses associated with Muin are:

- tressam fedmae - "strongest in exertion" in the Bríatharogam Morann mic Moín
- árusc n-airlig - "proverb of slaughter" in the Bríatharogam Mac ind Óc
- conar gotha - "path of the voice" in the Bríatharogam Con Culainn.

The Bríatharogam kennings reflect the fact the Old Irish muin has three homonyms meaning "neck, upper part of the back", "wile, ruse, trick", and "love, esteem". Which of these gave the letter its name is not known for certain, but is thought to be "neck". This is related to the archaic Welsh mwn ("neck") and Latin monile.
