= Úr =

Letter of the Ogham alphabet

Úr is the Irish name of the eighteenth letter of the Ogham alphabet, ᚒ, meaning "clay", "earth", "soil" and also "fresh" or "moist". In Old Irish, the letter name was also written Úir. Its phonetic value is [u] or [u:].

== Bríatharogam ==
In the medieval kennings, called Bríatharogaim or Word Ogham the verses associated with úr are:

úaraib adbaib - "in cold dwellings" in the Bríatharogam Morann mic Moín

sílad cland - "propagation of plants" in the Bríatharogam Mac ind Óc

forbbaid ambí - "shroud of a lifeless one" in the Bríatharogam Con Culainn.
