= Straif =

Letter of the Ogham alphabet

Straif is the Irish name of the fourteenth letter of the Ogham alphabet, ᚎ. Old Irish spelling variants are straif, straiph, zraif, sraif, sraiph, sraib.

The Bríatharogam kennings for the letter are:

- tressam rúamnai "strongest reddening"
- mórad rún "increase of secrets"
- saigid nél "seeking of clouds"

The probable meaning of the name is "sulfur". The first two kennings could be explained by the main use of sulphur as dye, and its alchemical significance, respectively. The third kenning could be a corruption of saiget nél "arrow of the clouds", i.e. sraibtine "lightning". An alternative kenning has aire srábae "chief of streams", and glossators adhering to the "Tree Alphabet" base an identification with draigen "blackthorn" on this, by thinking of a "hedge on a river". The "chief of streams" kenning may be referring to sulphur by reference to the stream of brimstone, sruth [s]ruibhe, mentioned in Isaiah 30:33.

The letter's original phonetic value is uncertain, but it may have been [st], [ts] or [sw]. The medieval manuscript tradition transcribes it with Latin Z.
