= Cweorð =

Rune

Name	Old English
Name	Cweorð/Cweorþ
Name	type of tree?
Shape	Futhorc
Unicode	ᛢ U+16E2
Transliteration	q
Transcription	q
IPA	[p]
Position in rune-row	*30

ᛢ, named cweorð, is a rune denoting q (the sound cluster /kw/) in the 32-type Anglo-Saxon Futhorc writing system (9th–12th c.). The glyph is a ᛇ rune modified with creased twigs.

The rune is a so called "manuscript rune", as it is only recorded in manuscripts.

The character was added into unicode in 1999 with Unicode 3.0.

== Etymology ==
Jackson Crawford sees a potential link between the Anglo-Saxon rune names for ᛢ (q) and ᛈ (p) in comparison to their Gothic analogs:

Letter		Anglo-Saxon	Gothic
P	ᛈ	peorð	pertra	(*paírþra)
Q	ᛢ	cweorð	quertra	(*qaírþra)

These may be borrowings from Celtic tree names originally, and then maybe byforms of one root form for a certain type of tree.
