= Coll (letter) =

Letter of the Ogham alphabet

Coll is the Irish name of the ninth letter of the Ogham alphabet ᚉ, meaning "hazel-tree", which is related to Welsh collen pl. cyll, and Latin corulus. Its Proto-Indo-European root was *kos(e)lo-. Its phonetic value is [k].

== Bríatharogam ==
In the medieval kennings, called Bríatharogam or Word Ogham the verses associated with Coll are:

- caíniu fedaib – "fairest tree" in the Bríatharogam Morann mic Moín
- carae blóesc – "friend of nutshells" in the Bríatharogam Mac ind Óc
- milsem fedo – "sweetest tree" in the Bríatharogam Con Culainn.
