= Ogham =

Early Medieval Irish alphabet

Ogham ᚛ᚑᚌᚐᚋ᚜
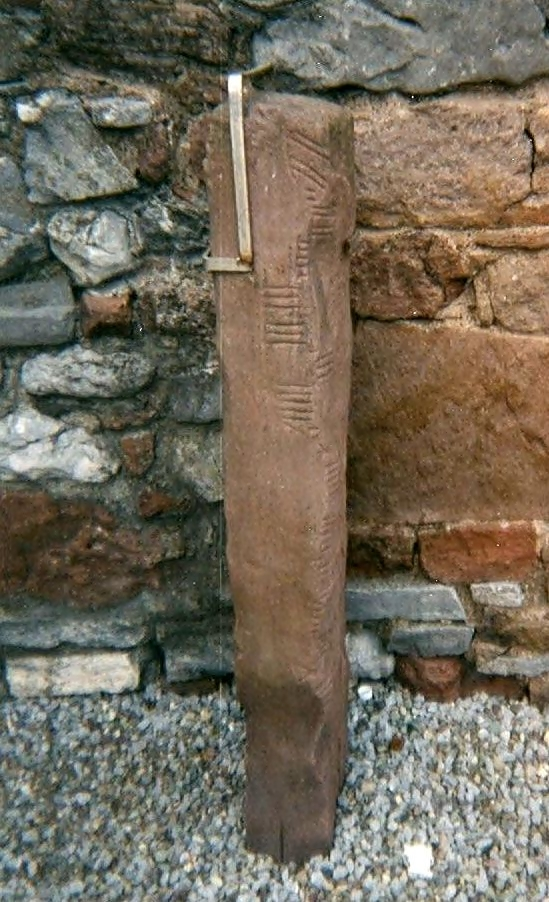
- An inscription found in 1975 in Ratass Church, Tralee, County Kerry
- Script type: Alphabet
- Period: c. 4th–10th centuries
- Direction: Bottom-to-top, left-to-right
- Languages: Primitive Irish; Old Irish; Pictish

Related scripts
- Parent systems: Unknown (possibly a cipher of Latin script; see Origins): Ogham ᚛ᚑᚌᚐᚋ᚜

ISO 15924
- ISO 15924: Ogam (212), Ogham

Unicode
- Unicode alias: Ogham
- Unicode range: U+1680–U+169F

Ogham (also ogam and ogom, /ˈɒɡəm/ OG-əm, Modern Irish: ogham [ˈoː(ə)mˠ]; Middle Irish: ogum, ogom, later ogam [ˈɔɣəmˠ]) is an Early Medieval alphabet used primarily to write the Primitive Irish language (in the "orthodox" inscriptions, 4th to 6th centuries AD), and later the Old Irish language (scholastic ogham, 6th to 9th centuries). It was also used much less frequently to record the Pictish language in what is now Scotland. There are roughly 400 surviving orthodox inscriptions on stone monuments throughout Ireland and western Britain, the bulk of which are in southern areas of the Irish province of Munster. The Munster counties of Cork and Kerry contain 60% of all Irish ogham stones. The largest number outside Ireland are in Pembrokeshire, Wales.

The inscriptions usually consist of personal names written in a set formula.

Many of the High Medieval Bríatharogaim (kennings for the ogham letters) are understood to reference various trees and plants. This interpretation was popularized by Robert Graves in his book The White Goddess; for this reason, Ogham is sometimes known as the Celtic tree alphabet.

The etymology of the word ogam or ogham remains unclear. One possible origin is from the Irish og-úaim 'point-seam', referring to the seam made by the point of a sharp weapon.

== Origins ==
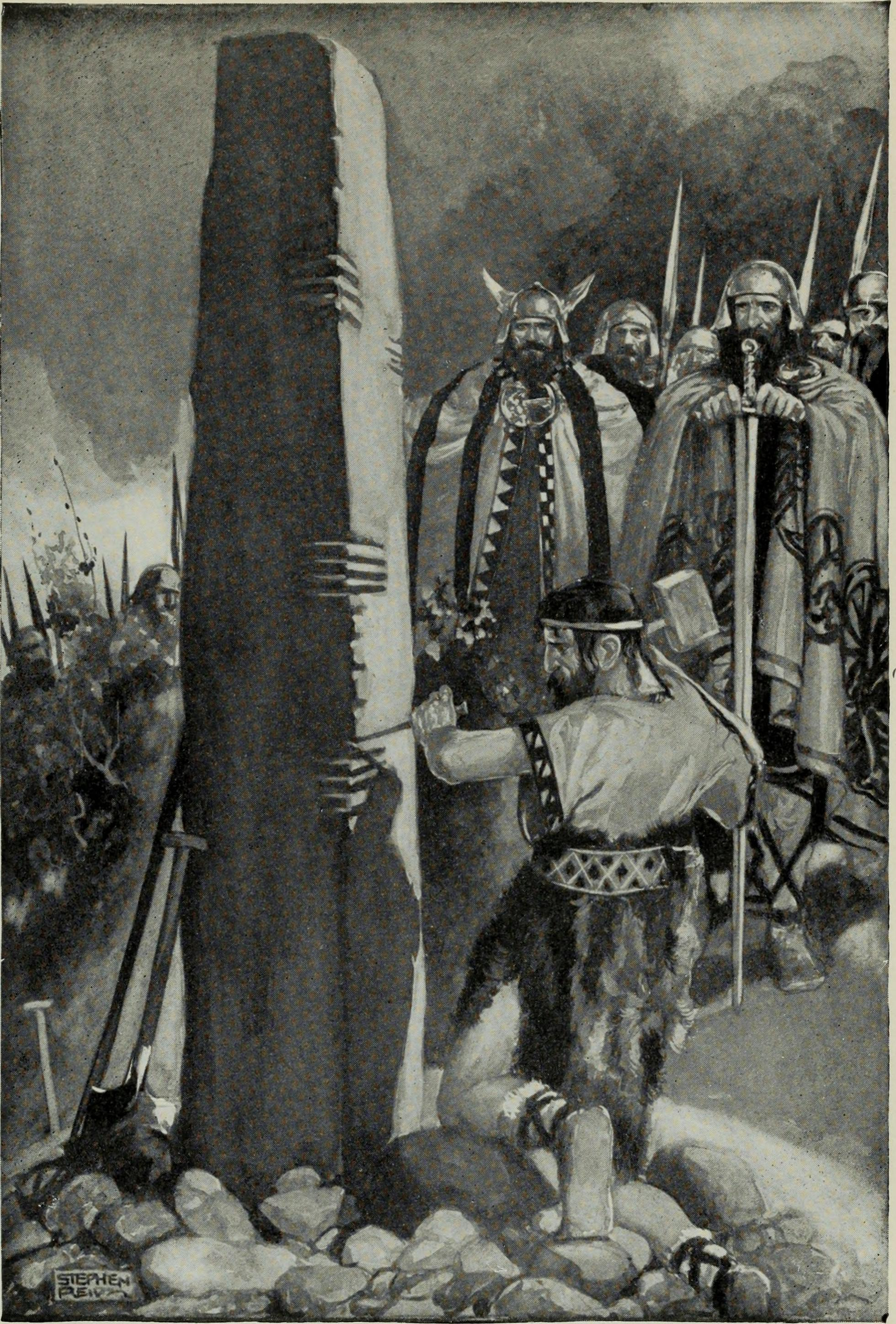
Carving of ogham letters into a stone pillar – illustration by Stephen Reid (1873–1948), in: Myths & Legends of the Celtic Race by T. W. Rolleston (1857–1920), published 1911, p. 288

Archaeological evidence shows that the earliest inscriptions in ogham date to about the 4th century AD, but James Carney believed its origin is rather within the 1st century BC, though he stated this without evidence. Although the use of classical ogham in stone inscriptions seems to have flourished in the 5th and 6th centuries around the Irish Sea, from the phonological evidence it is clear that the alphabet predates the 5th century. Indeed, the alphabet has letters representing archaic phonemes which were clearly part of the system, but which were no longer spoken by the 5th century and never appear in inscriptions, suggesting an extended period of ogham writing on wood or other perishable material prior to the preserved monumental inscriptions. They are: úath ("H") and straif ("Z" in the manuscript tradition, but probably "F" from "SW"), and gétal (velar nasal "NG" in the manuscript tradition, but etymologically probably "GW").

The Ogham alphabet was made to fit the Latin language, but there is speculation that it was modelled on another script, and some even consider it a mere cipher of its template script (Düwel 1968: points out similarity with ciphers of Germanic runes). The largest number of scholars favour the Latin alphabet as this template, although the Elder Futhark and even the Greek alphabet have their supporters. Runic origin would elegantly explain the presence of "H" and "Z" letters unused in Irish, as well as the presence of vocalic and consonantal variants "U" vs. "W", unknown to Latin writing and lost in Greek (cf. digamma). The Latin alphabet is the primary contender mainly because its influence at the required period (4th century) is most easily established, being widely used in neighbouring Roman Britannia, while runes in the 4th century were not very widespread even in continental Europe.

In Ireland and Wales, the language of the monumental stone inscriptions is termed Primitive Irish. The transition to Old Irish, the language of the earliest sources in the Latin alphabet, takes place in about the 6th century. Since ogham inscriptions consist almost exclusively of personal names and marks possibly indicating land ownership, linguistic information that may be gleaned from the Primitive Irish period is mostly restricted to phonological developments.

=== Theories of origin ===
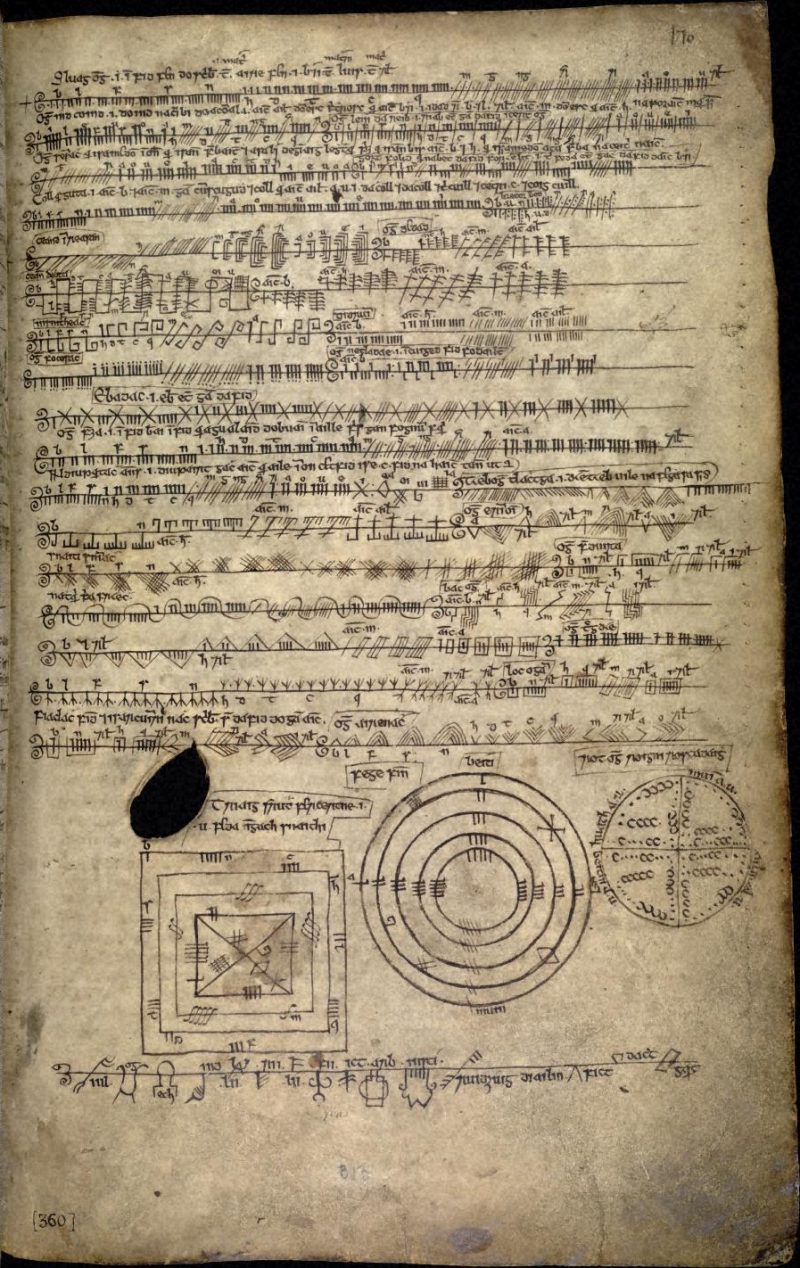
Fol. 170r of the Book of Ballymote (1390), the Auraicept na n-Éces explaining the ogham script

There are two main schools of thought among scholars as to the motivation for the creation of ogham. Scholars such as Carney and MacNeill have suggested that ogham was first created as a cryptic alphabet, designed by the Irish to hide their meaning from writers of the Latin alphabet. In this school of thought, it is asserted that "the alphabet was created by Irish scholars or druids for political, military or religious reasons to provide a secret means of communication in opposition to the authorities of Roman Britain." The serious threat of invasion by the Roman Empire, which then ruled over neighbouring central and southern Britain, may have spurred the creation of the alphabet. Alternatively, in later centuries when the threat of invasion had receded and the Irish were themselves invading western Britain, the desire to keep communications secret from Romans or Romanised Britons would still have provided an incentive. With bilingual ogham and Latin inscriptions in Wales, however, one would suppose that the ogham could easily be decoded by at least an educated few in the post-Roman world.

The second main school of thought, put forward by scholars such as McManus, is that ogham was invented by the first Christian communities in early Ireland, out of a desire for a unique alphabet to write short messages and inscriptions in Irish. The sounds of Primitive Irish may have been difficult to transcribe into the Latin alphabet, motivating the invention of a separate alphabet. A possible such origin, as suggested by McManus (1991:41), is the early Irish Christian community known from around AD 400 at latest, attested by the mission of Palladius by Pope Celestine I in AD 431.

A variation is the idea that this alphabet was first invented, for whatever reason, in 4th-century Irish settlements in west Wales after contact and intermarriage with Romanised Britons with knowledge of the Latin alphabet. In fact, several ogham stones in Wales are bilingual, containing both Irish and British Latin, testifying to the international contacts that led to the existence of some of these stones.

A third hypothesis, put forward by the noted ogham scholar R. A. S. Macalister was influential at one time, but finds little favour with scholars today. He believed – because ogham consists of four groups of five letters with a sequence of strokes from one to five – that ogham was first invented as a secret system of finger signals in Cisalpine Gaul around 600 BC by Gaulish druids, and was inspired by a form of the Greek alphabet current in Northern Italy at the time. According to this idea, the alphabet was transmitted in oral form or on wood only, until it was finally put into a permanent form on stone inscriptions in early Christian Ireland. Later scholars are largely united in rejecting this hypothesis, however, primarily because a detailed study of the letters shows that they were created specifically for the Primitive Irish of the early centuries AD. The supposed links with the form of the Greek alphabet that Macalister proposed can also be disproved.

A fourth hypothesis, proposed by the scholars Rudolf Thurneysen and Joseph Vendryes, is that the forms of the letters derive from a numerical tally-mark counting system of the time, based around the numbers five and twenty, which was then adapted into an alphabet.

=== Legendary accounts ===
According to the 11th-century Lebor Gabála Érenn, the 14th-century Auraicept na n-Éces, and other Medieval Irish folklore, ogham was first invented soon after the fall of the Tower of Babel, along with the Gaelic language, by the legendary Scythian king, Fenius Farsa. According to the Auraicept, Fenius journeyed from Scythia together with Goídel mac Ethéoir, Íar mac Nema and a retinue of 72 scholars. They came to the plain of Shinar to study the confused languages at Nimrod's tower (the Tower of Babel). Finding that they had already been dispersed, Fenius sent his scholars to study them, staying at the tower, coordinating the effort. After ten years, the investigations were complete, and Fenius created in Bérla tóbaide "the selected language", taking the best of each of the confused tongues, which he called Goídelc, Goidelic, after Goídel mac Ethéoir. He also created extensions of Goídelc, called Bérla Féne, after himself, Íarmberla, after Íar mac Nema, and others, and the Beithe-luis-nuin (the ogham) as a perfected writing system for his languages. The names he gave to the letters were those of his 25 best scholars.

Alternatively, the Ogam Tract credits Ogma with the script's invention. Ogma was skilled in speech and poetry, and created the system for the learned, to confound rustics and fools. The first message written in ogam was seven b's on a birch, sent as a warning to Lug, meaning: "your wife will be carried away seven times to the otherworld unless the birch protects her". For this reason, the letter b is said to be named after the birch, and In Lebor Ogaim goes on to tell the tradition that all letters were named after trees, a claim also referred to by the Auraicept as an alternative to the naming after Fenius' disciples.

== Name ==
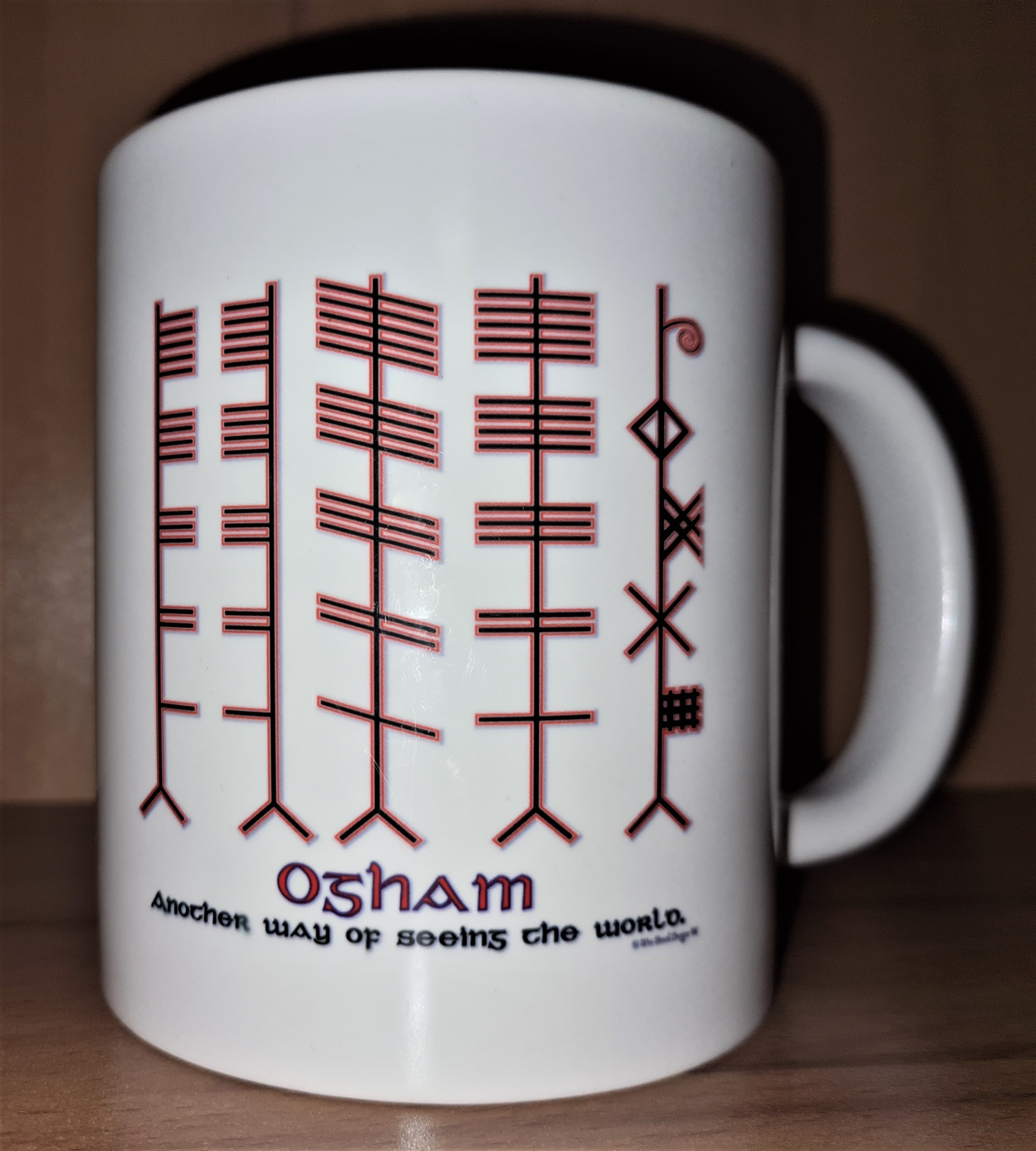
Mug with ogham letters: the four series (aicmi) of the 20 original letters and the five most important supplementary letters (forfeda)

Strictly speaking, the word ogham means 'letters', while the alphabet is called beith-luis-nin after the letter names of the first letters (in the same way that the modern word alphabet derives from the Greek letters alpha and beta). The order of the first five letters, BLFSN, led the scholar Macalister to propose that a link between a form of the Greek alphabet used in Northern Italy in the 6th and 5th centuries BC. However, there is no evidence for Macalister's theory, and it has been discounted by later scholars. There are in fact other explanations for the name Beith-luis-nin. One explanation is that the word nin, which means 'forked branch', was used to mean letters in general. Beith-luis-nin could therefore mean simply beith-luis letters. Another suggestion is that beith-luis-nin is a contraction of the first five letters, ie, beith-LVS-nin.

== Letters ==
The ogham alphabet originally consisted of twenty letters, divided into four groups (Irish: aicme, lit. 'family') according the stroke angle and direction. The groups were

- Irish: Aicme beithe, lit. 'B group', right side/downward strokes
- Irish: Aicme hÚatha, lit. 'H group', left side/upward strokes
- Irish: Aicme muine, lit. 'M group', oblique crossing strokes
- Irish: Aicme ailme, lit. 'A group', notches or perpendicular crossing strokes

Five additional letters were later introduced (mainly in the manuscript tradition), the so-called forfeda.

Of the five forfeda or supplementary letters, only the first, ébad, regularly appears in inscriptions, but mostly with the value K (McManus, § 5.3, 1991), in the word koi (ᚕᚑᚔ 'here'). The others, except for emancholl, have at most only one certain 'orthodox' (see below) inscription each. Due to their limited practical use, later ogamists turned the supplementary letters into a series of diphthongs, changing completely the values for pín and emancholl. This meant that the alphabet was once again without a letter for the 'P' sound, forcing the invention of the letter peithboc (soft 'B'), which appears in the manuscripts only.

Image (V)	Image (H)	Unicode	Name	Trans. (Note: As per Old Irish manuscript tradition.)	IPA (Note: Values are given in Primitive Irish except where indicated.)	Meaning of name
		ᚁ	beith	b	[b]	birch
		ᚂ	luis	l	[l]	plant rowan (Note: Arboreal tradition)
		ᚃ	fearn	f	[w] (Note: Primitive Irish) [f] (Note: Old Irish)	alder
		ᚄ	sail	s	[s]	willow
		ᚅ	nion	n	[n]	fork; loft ash
		ᚆ	uath	h	[j] [h]	horror; fear whitethorn
		ᚇ	dair	d	[d]	oak
		ᚈ	tinne	t	[t]	ingot holly
		ᚉ	coll	c	[k]	hazel
		ᚊ	ceirt	q	[kʷ] [k]	bush; rag apple
		ᚋ	muin	m	[m]	neck; ruse; love vine
		ᚌ	gort	g	[g]	field ivy
		ᚍ	ngéadal	ng	[gʷ] [ng]	killing broom; fern
		ᚎ	straif	st	[st]	sulphur blackthorn
		ᚏ	ruis	r	[r]	red broom; elder
		ᚐ	ailm	a	[a]	pine; fir
		ᚑ	onn	o	[o]	ash; furze
		ᚒ	úr	u	[u]	earth; clay; soil heath
		ᚓ	eadhadh	e	[e]	unknown aspen
		ᚔ	iodhadh	i	[i]	unknown yew
		ᚕ	éabhadh	ea	[ea], [k], [x], [eo][f]	unknown aspen
		ᚖ	óir	oi	[oi][f]	gold ivy
		ᚗ	uilleann	ui	[ui][f]	elbow honeysuckle
		ᚘ	pín; ifín	p; io	[ia][f]	spine; thorn
		ᚙ	eamhancholl	ch; x; ae	[x]; [ai][f]	twin of coll
		ᚚ	peith; beithe bog	p	[p][f]	soft beith

Ogham script can also be expressed schematically as follows:

B group	beith ᚁ IPA: [b]	luis ᚂ IPA: [l]	fearn ᚃ IPA: [w]	sail ᚄ IPA: [s]	nion ᚅ IPA: [n]
H group	uath ᚆ IPA: [j]	dair ᚇ IPA: [d]	tinne ᚈ IPA: [t]	coll ᚉ IPA: [k]	ceirt ᚊ IPA: [kʷ]
M group	muin ᚋ IPA: [m]	gort ᚌ IPA: [ɡ]	nGéadal ᚍ IPA: [ɡʷ]	straif ᚎ IPA: [st], [ts], [sw]	ruis ᚏ IPA: [r]
A group	ailm ᚐ IPA: [a]	onn ᚑ IPA: [o]	úr ᚒ IPA: [u]	eadhadh ᚓ IPA: [e]	iodhadh ᚔ IPA: [i]
Forfeda	éabhadh ᚕ IPA: [ea], [k], [x], [eo]	ór ᚖ IPA: [oi]	uilleann ᚗ IPA: [ui]	ifín ᚘ IPA: [ia]	eamhancholl ᚙ IPA: [x], [ai]

=== Letter names ===
The letter names are interpreted as names of trees or shrubs in manuscript tradition, both in Auraicept na n-Éces ('The Scholars' Primer') and In Lebor Ogaim ('The Ogam Tract'). They were first discussed in modern times by Ruaidhrí Ó Flaithbheartaigh (1685), who took them at face value. The Auraicept itself is aware that not all names are known tree names: "Now all these are wood names such as are found in the Ogham Book of Woods, and are not derived from men", admitting that "some of these trees are not known today". The Auraicept gives a short phrase or kenning for each letter, known as a Bríatharogam, that traditionally accompanied each letter name, and a further gloss explaining their meanings and identifying the tree or plant linked to each letter. Only five of the twenty primary letters have tree names that the Auraicept considers comprehensible without further glosses, namely beith 'birch', fearn 'alder', saille 'willow', duir 'oak' and coll 'hazel'. All the other names have to be glossed or "translated".

According to the leading modern ogham scholar, Damian McManus, the "Tree Alphabet" idea dates to the Old Irish period (say, 10th century), but it postdates the Primitive Irish period, or at least the time when the letters were originally named. Its origin is probably due to the letters themselves being called feda 'trees', or nin 'forking branches' due to their shape. Since a few of the letters were, in fact, named after trees, the interpretation arose that they were called feda because of that. Some of the other letter names had fallen out of use as independent words, and were thus free to be claimed as "Old Gaelic" tree names, while others (such as ruis, úath or gort) were more or less forcefully reinterpreted as epithets of trees by the medieval glossators.

McManus (1991, §3.15) discusses possible etymologies of all the letter names, and as well as the five mentioned above, he adds one other definite tree name: onn 'ash' (the Auraicept wrongly has 'furze'). McManus (1988, p. 164) also believes that the name idad is probably an artificial form of iubhar 'yew', as the kennings support that meaning, and concedes that ailm may possibly mean 'pine tree', as it appears to be used to mean that in an 8th-century poem. Thus out of twenty letter names, only eight at most are the names of trees. The other names have a variety of meanings.

- Beith, Old Irish Beithe means 'birch-tree', cognate to Middle Welsh bedw. Latin betula is considered a borrowing from the Gaulish cognate.
- Luis, Old Irish Luis is either related to luise 'blaze' or lus 'herb'. The arboreal tradition has caertheand 'rowan'.
- Fearn, Old Irish Fern means 'alder-tree', Primitive Irish *wernā, so that the original value of the letter was [w].
- Sail, Old Irish Sail means 'willow-tree', cognate to Latin salix.
- Nion, Old Irish Nin means either 'fork' or 'loft'. The arboreal tradition has uinnius 'ash-tree'.
- Uath, Old Irish Úath means úath 'horror, fear'; the arboreal tradition has 'white-thorn'. The original etymology of the name, and the letter's value, are however unclear. McManus (1986) suggested a value [y]. Peter Schrijver (see McManus 1991:37) suggested that if úath 'fear' is cognate with Latin pavere, a trace of PIE *p might have survived into Primitive Irish, but there is no independent evidence for this.
- Dair, Old Irish Dair means 'oak' (Proto-Indo-European: *doru-).
- Tinne, Old Irish Tinne from the evidence of the kennings means 'bar of metal, ingot'. The arboreal tradition has cuileand 'holly'.
- Coll, Old Irish Coll meant 'hazel-tree', cognate with Welsh collen, correctly glossed as cainfidh 'fair-wood' ('hazel') by the arboreal interpretation. Latin corulus or corylus is cognate.
- Ceirt, Old Irish Cert is cognate with Welsh perth 'bush', Latin quercus 'oak' (Proto-Indo-European: *perkwos). It was confused with Old Irish ceirt 'rag', reflected in the kennings. The Auraicept glosses aball 'apple'.
- Muin, Old Irish Muin: the kennings connect this name to three different words, muin 'neck, upper part of the back', muin 'wile, ruse', and muin 'love, esteem'. The arboreal tradition has finemhain 'vine'.
- Gort, Old Irish Gort means 'field' (cognate to garden). The arboreal tradition has edind 'ivy'.
- nGéadal, Old Irish Gétal from the kennings has a meaning of 'killing', maybe cognate to gonid 'slays', from PIE *gwen-. The value of the letter in Primitive Irish, then, was a voiced labiovelar, [ɡʷ]. The arboreal tradition glosses cilcach, 'broom' or 'fern'.
- Straif, Old Irish Straiph means 'sulphur'. The Primitive Irish letter value is uncertain, it may have been a sibilant different from s, which is taken by sail, maybe a reflex of /st/ or /sw/. The arboreal tradition glosses draighin 'blackthorn'.
- Ruis, Old Irish Ruis means 'red' or 'redness', glossed as trom 'elder'.
- Ailm, Old Irish Ailm is of uncertain meaning, possibly 'pine-tree'. The Auraicept has crand giuis .i. ochtach, 'fir-tree' or 'pinetree'.
- Onn, Old Irish Onn means 'ash-tree', although the Auraicept glosses aiten 'furze'.
- Úr, Old Irish Úr, based on the kennings, means 'earth, clay, soil'. The Auraicept glosses fraech 'heath'.
- Eadhadh, Old Irish Edad of unknown meaning. The Auraicept glosses crand fir no crithach 'test-tree or aspen'
- Iodhadh, Old Irish Idad is of uncertain meaning, but is probably a form of ibhar 'yew', which is the meaning given to it in the arboreal tradition.

Of the forfeda, four are glossed by the Auraicept:

- Eabhadh, Old Irish Ebhadh with crithach 'aspen';
- Ór, 'gold' (from Latin aurum); the arboreal tradition has feorus no edind, 'spindle tree or ivy'
- Uilleann, Old Irish Uilleand 'elbow'; the arboreal tradition has edleand 'honeysuckle'
- Pín, later Ifín, Old Irish Iphin with spinan no ispin 'gooseberry or thorn'.

The fifth letter is emancholl which means 'twin of hazel'

== Corpus ==
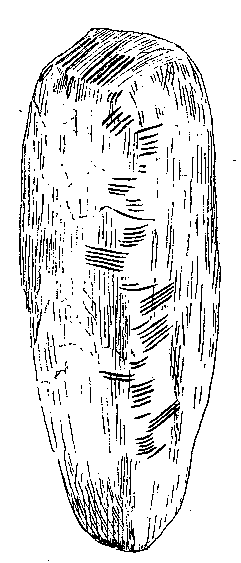
Ogham stone from the Isle of Man showing the droim in the centre. Text reads BIVAIDONAS MAQI MUCOI CUNAVA[LI], or in English, "Of Bivaidonas, son of the tribe Cunava[li]".

Monumental ogham inscriptions are found in Ireland and Wales, with a few additional specimens found in southwest England (Devon and Cornwall), the Isle of Man, and Scotland, including Shetland and a single example from Silchester and another from Coventry in England. They were mainly employed as territorial markers and memorials (grave stones). The stone commemorating Vortiporius, a 6th-century king of Dyfed (originally located in Clynderwen), is the only ogham stone inscription that bears the name of an identifiable individual. The language of the inscriptions is predominantly Primitive Irish; the few inscriptions in Scotland, such as the Lunnasting stone, record fragments of what is probably the Pictish language.

The more ancient examples are standing stones, where the script was carved into the edge (droim or faobhar) of the stone, which formed the stemline against which individual characters are cut. The text of these "Orthodox Ogham" inscriptions is read beginning from the bottom left-hand side of a stone, continuing upward along the edge, across the top and down the right-hand side (in the case of long inscriptions). Roughly 380 inscriptions are known in total (a number, incidentally, very close to the number of known inscriptions in the contemporary Elder Futhark), of which the highest concentration by far is found in the southwestern Irish province of Munster. Over one-third of the total are found in County Kerry alone, most densely in the former kingdom of the Corcu Duibne.

Later inscriptions are known as "scholastic", and are post 6th century in date. The term 'scholastic' derives from the fact that the inscriptions are believed to have been inspired by the manuscript sources, instead of being continuations of the original monument tradition. Unlike orthodox ogham, some medieval inscriptions feature all five Forfeda. Scholastic inscriptions are written on stemlines cut into the face of the stone, instead of along its edge. Ogham was also occasionally used for notes in manuscripts down to the 16th century. A modern ogham inscription is found on a gravestone dating to 1802 in Ahenny, County Tipperary.

In Scotland, a number of inscriptions using the ogham writing system are known, but their language is still the subject of debate. It has been argued by Richard Cox in The Language of Ogham Inscriptions in Scotland (1999) that the language of these is Old Norse, but others remain unconvinced by this analysis, and regard the stones as being Pictish in origin. However, due to the lack of knowledge about the Picts, the inscriptions remain undeciphered. The Pictish inscriptions are scholastic, and are believed to have been inspired by the manuscript tradition brought into Scotland by Gaelic settlers.

A rare example of a Christianised (cross-inscribed) Ogham stone can be seen in St. Mary's Collegiate Church Gowran, County Kilkenny.

== Non-monumental uses ==
As well as its use for monumental inscriptions, the evidence from early Irish sagas and legends indicate that ogham was used for short messages on wood or metal, either to relay messages or to denote ownership of the object inscribed. Some of these messages seem to have been cryptic in nature and some were also for magical purposes. In addition, there is evidence from sources such as In Lebor Ogaim, or the Ogham Tract, that ogham may have been used to keep records or lists, such as genealogies and numerical tallies of property and business transactions. There is also evidence that ogham may have been used as a system of finger or hand signals.

In later centuries when ogham ceased to be used as a practical alphabet, it retained its place in the learning of Gaelic scholars and poets as the basis of grammar and the rules of poetry. Indeed, until modern times the Latin alphabet in Gaelic continued to be taught using letter names borrowed from the Beith-Luis-Nin, along with the Medieval association of each letter with a different tree.

== Samples ==
Ogham	Transliteration	English translation	Source
᚛ᚁᚔᚃᚐᚔᚇᚑᚅᚐᚄᚋᚐᚊᚔᚋᚒᚉᚑᚔ᚜ ᚛ᚉᚒᚅᚐᚃᚐ[ᚂᚔ]᚜	bivaidonas maqi mucoi cunava[li]	"[Stone] of Bivaidonas, son of the tribe Cunava[li]"	Ballaqueeney Ogham Stone, Isle of Man
᚛ᚂᚓᚌᚌ[--]ᚄᚇ[--]ᚂᚓᚌᚓᚄᚉᚐᚇ᚜ ᚛ᚋᚐᚊ ᚉᚑᚏᚏᚁᚏᚔ ᚋᚐᚊ ᚐᚋᚋᚂᚂᚑᚌᚔᚈᚈ᚜	legg[...]sd[...]legescad maq corrbri maq ammllogitt	"Legescad, son of Corrbrias, son of Ammllogitt"	Breastagh Ogham Stone, County Mayo, Ireland

== Unicode ==
Ogham was added to the Unicode Standard in September 1999 with the release of version 3.0.

The spelling of the names given is a standardisation dating to 1997, used in Unicode Standard and in Irish Standard 434:1999.

The Unicode block for ogham is U+1680–U+169F.

Ogham^{[1]}^{[2]} Official Unicode Consortium code chart (PDF)
	0	1	2	3	4	5	6	7	8	9	A	B	C	D	E	F
U+168x		ᚁ	ᚂ	ᚃ	ᚄ	ᚅ	ᚆ	ᚇ	ᚈ	ᚉ	ᚊ	ᚋ	ᚌ	ᚍ	ᚎ	ᚏ
U+169x	ᚐ	ᚑ	ᚒ	ᚓ	ᚔ	ᚕ	ᚖ	ᚗ	ᚘ	ᚙ	ᚚ	᚛	᚜			
Notes 1.As of Unicode version 18.0 2.Grey areas indicate non-assigned code points

== Neopaganism ==
Modern New Age and Neopagan approaches to ogham largely derive from the now-discredited theories of Robert Graves in his book The White Goddess. In this work, Graves took his inspiration from the theories of the ogham scholar R. A. S. Macalister (see above) and elaborated on them much further. Graves proposed that the ogham alphabet encoded a set of beliefs originating in the Middle East in Stone Age times, concerning the ceremonies surrounding the worship of the Moon goddess in her various forms. Graves' argument is extremely complex, but in essence, he argues that the Hebrews, Greeks and Celts were all influenced by a people originating in the Aegean, called 'the people of the sea' by the Egyptians, who spread out around Europe in the 2nd millennium BC, taking their religious beliefs with them. He posits that at some early stage these teachings were encoded in alphabet form by poets to pass on their worship of the goddess (as the muse and inspiration of all poets) in a secret fashion, understandable only to initiates. Eventually, via the druids of Gaul, this knowledge was passed on to the poets of early Ireland and Wales. Graves, therefore, looked at the Tree Alphabet tradition surrounding ogham and explored the tree folklore of each of the letter names, proposing that the order of the letters formed an ancient "seasonal calendar of tree magic". Although his theories have been discredited and discarded by modern scholars (including Macalister himself, with whom Graves corresponded), they were taken up with enthusiasm by some adherents of the neopagan movement. In addition, Graves followed the BLNFS order of ogham letters put forward by Macalister (see above), with the result taken up by many New Age and Neopagan writers as the 'correct' order of the letters, despite its rejection by scholars.

The main use of ogham by adherents of Neo-druidism and other forms of Neopaganism is for the purpose of divination. Divination with ogham symbols is possibly mentioned in Tochmarc Étaíne, a tale in the Irish Mythological Cycle, wherein the druid Dalan takes four wands of yew, and writes ogham letters upon them. Then he uses the tools for what some interpret as a form of divination. However, as the tale doesn't explain how the sticks are handled or interpreted, this theory is open to interpretation. A divination method invented by neopagans involves casting sticks upon a cloth marked out with a pattern, such as Finn's Window, and interpreting the patterns. The meanings assigned in these modern methods are usually based on the tree ogham, with each letter associated with a tree or plant, and meanings derived from these associations. While some use folklore for the meanings, Robert Graves' book The White Goddess continues to be a major influence on these methods and beliefs.

== See also ==
- Auraicept na n-Éces
- Coelbren y Beirdd — A similar runic alphabet based on the Celtic vigesimal system invented by Iolo Morganwg for the Welsh language.
- Ogham inscription
- Primitive Irish
- Runic alphabet
- Scottish Gaelic alphabet
- Star Carr Pendant
- Thaana — Script used to write the Maldivian language where letters are based on numerals.

== General and cited references ==
- Carney, James. The Invention of the Ogam Cipher 'Ériu' 22, 1975, pp. 62–63, Dublin: Royal Irish Academy
- Dark, Ken (2000). Britain and the End of the Roman Empire. Stroud, UK: Tempus Publishing. ISBN 978-0-7524-2532-0.
- Düwel, Klaus. Runenkunde (runic studies). Stuttgart/Weimar: Metzler, 1968. OCLC 183700
- Forsyth, Katherine. The Ogham Inscriptions of Scotland: An Edited Corpus, PhD Dissertation, Harvard University (Ann Arbor: UMI, 1996). OCLC 48938210
- Gippert, Jost; Hlaváček, Ivan; Homolka, Jaromír. Ogam. Eine frühe keltische Schrifterfindung, Praha: Charles University, 1992. ISBN 80-901489-3-X OCLC 39570484
- Macalister, Robert A. S. The Secret Languages of Ireland, pp. 27–36, Cambridge University Press, 1937
- Macalister, Robert A. S. Corpus inscriptionum insularum celticarum. First edition. Dublin: Stationery Office, 1945–1949. OCLC 71392234
- McManus, Damian. Ogam: Archaizing, Orthography and the Authenticity of the Manuscript Key to the Alphabet, Ériu 37, 1988, 1–31. Dublin: Royal Irish Academy. OCLC 56088345
- McManus, Damian. A Guide to Ogam, Maynooth 1991. ISBN 1-870684-17-6 OCLC 24181838
- MacNeill, Eoin. Archaisms in the Ogham Inscriptions, 'Proceedings of the Royal Irish Academy' 39, pp. 33–53, Dublin
- O'Brien, Michael A., ed. (1962). Corpus Genealogiarum Hiberniae. Vol. 1. Kelleher, John V. (intro. in the reprints of 1976 and 2005). Dublin: DIAS. ISBN 0901282316. OCLC 56540733.
- Raftery, Barry. A Late Ogham Inscription from Co. Tipperary, Journal of the Royal Society of Antiquaries of Ireland 99, 1969. ISSN 0035-9106 OCLC 6906544
- Swift, C. Ogam Stones and the Earliest Irish Christians, Maynooth: Dept. of Old and Middle Irish, St. Patrick's College, 1997. ISBN 0-901519-98-7 OCLC 37398935
- Ranke-Graves, Robert von. Die Weisse Göttin: Sprache des Mythos (The White Goddess), ISBN 978-3-499-55416-2 OCLC 52100148, several re-editions, but rarely available. Editions available in German and English.
- Sims-Williams, Patrick. The Celtic Inscriptions of Britain: Phonology and Chronology, c. 400–1200. (Publications of the Philological Society 37) Oxford : Blackwell Publishing, 2003. ISBN 1-4051-0903-3
- Stifter, David and White, Nora. 'Early Literacy and Multilingualism in Ireland and Britain', Languages and Communities in the Late-Roman and Post-Imperial Western Provinces, pp. 203–235. Oxford: Oxford University Press, 2023. ISBN 9780198888956 doi:10.1093/oso/9780198888956.003.0008
- Thurneysen, Rudolf. Zum Ogam, Beiträge zur Geschichte der deutschen Sprache und Literatur, 61 (1937), pp. 188–208.
- Vendryès, Joseph. L'écriture ogamique et ses origines Études Celtiques, 4 (1941), pp. 83–116.
