= Ruis (letter) =

Letter of the Ogham alphabet

Ruis (ᚏ) is the fifteenth letter of the Ogham alphabet, derived from ruise "red" or "reddening". The kennings refer to the reddening of the face caused by intense emotion, and medieval glossators also refer to the practice of reddening the cheeks with the juice of plants. Its Proto-Indo-European root was *h₁reudʰ- 'red'. Its phonetic value is [r].

== Bríatharogam ==
In the medieval kennings, called Bríatharogaim or Word Ogham the verses associated with ruis are:

tindem rucci - "most intense blushing" in the Bríatharogam Morann mic Moín

rúamnae drech - "reddening of faces" in the Bríatharogam Mac ind Óc

bruth fergae - "glow of anger" in the Bríatharogam Con Culainn.
