= Onn =

Letter of the Ogham alphabet

Onn is the Irish name of the seventeenth letter of the Ogham alphabet, ᚑ, meaning "ash-tree". It is related to Welsh onn(en), from the root was *ōs-, *osen 'ash'. Its phonetic value is [o]. The letter's Bríatharogam kennings are the following:

- congnaid ech "wounder of horses"
- féthem soíre "smoothest of craftsmanship"
- lúth fían "[equipment] of warrior bands"

These refer to different uses of ashwood as horsewhips, wood used by carpenters, and for spears. In the Old Irish period, onn "ash" was replaced by uinnius. McManus takes this as an indication that the Ogham letter names date to the Primitive Irish (pre-6th century) period.
