= Gort (letter) =

Letter of the Ogham alphabet

Gort is the Irish name of the twelfth letter of the Ogham alphabet, ᚌ, meaning "field", which is related to Welsh garth 'field, enclosure' and Latin hortus. Its Proto-Indo-European root was *gher-, *ghort- 'to enclose, enclosure'. Its phonetic value is [ɡ].

== Bríatharogam ==
In the medieval kennings, called Bríatharogaim or Word Ogham, the verses associated with gort are:

- milsiu féraib – "sweetest grass" in the Bríatharogam Morann mic Moín
- ined erc – "suitable place for cows" in the Bríatharogam Mac ind Óc
- sásad ile – "sating of multitudes" in the Bríatharogam Con Culainn.
