= In Lebor Ogaim =

Old Irish treatise on the ogham alphabet

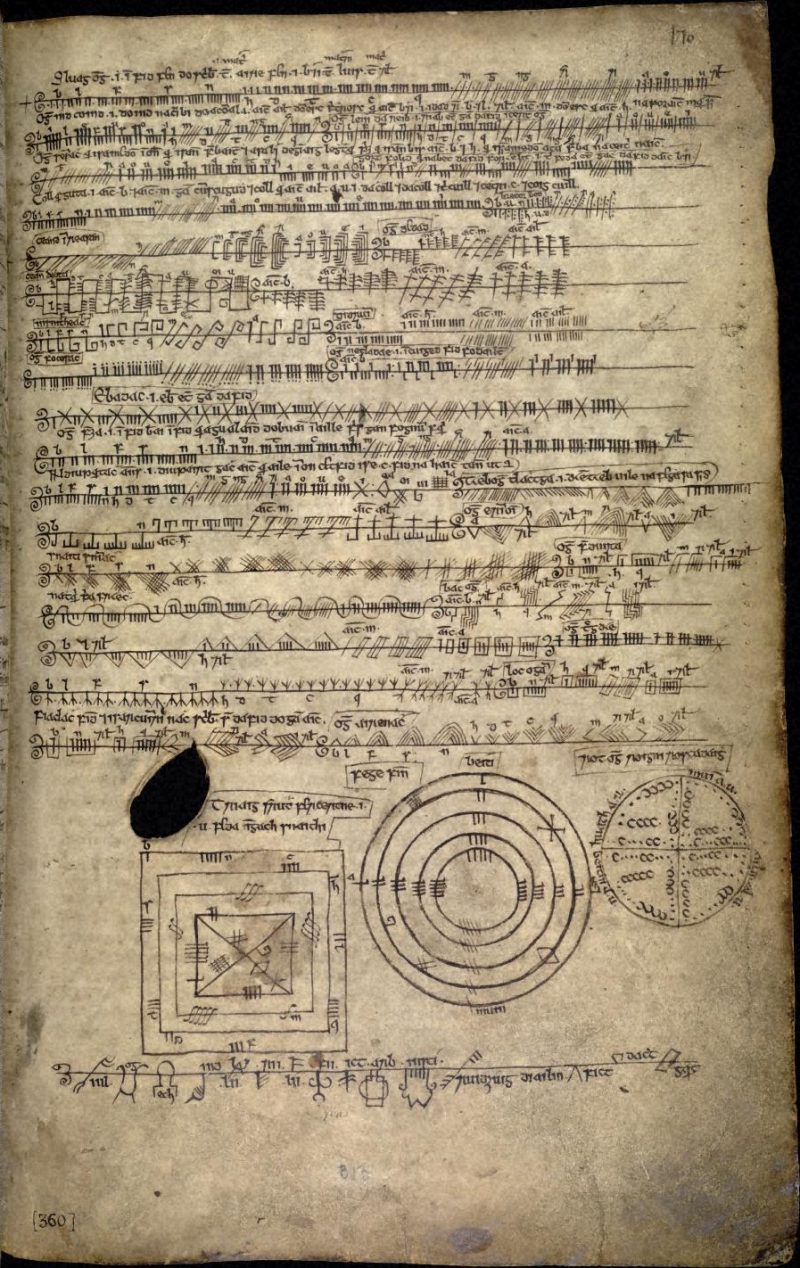
fol. 170r of the Book of Ballymote, variants of ogham, nr. 43 (sluagogam) to nr. 77 (sigla).

In Lebor Ogaim ("The Book of Ogams"), also known as the Ogam Tract, is an Old Irish treatise on the ogham alphabet. It is preserved in R.I.A. MS 23 P 12 308–314 (AD 1390), T.C.D. H.3.18, 26.1–35.28 (AD 1511) and National Library of Ireland MS G53 1–22 (17th century), and fragments in British Library Add. 4783. It does not bear a title in the manuscripts, but it is mentioned in the Auraicept na n-Éces (2813f.) as amal isber in leapar ogaim, whence the commonly used title. The Ogham Tract is independent of the Auraicept, and is our main source for the Bríatharogaim.

The Ogham Tract also gives a variety of some 100 "scales" of variant or secret modes of writing ogham (92 in the Book of Ballymote), for example the "shield ogham" (ogam airenach, nr. 73). Even the Younger Futhark are introduced as "Viking ogham" (nrs. 91, 92). Some of these are word lists based on the alphabet, and some seem to involve a numerical system of tallying. Most however, are simply variations on ways of writing the alphabet. They are examined for their significance by Macalister (1937) and by McManus (§7.11, 1991).

The training of the Gaelic poet or file involved learning one hundred and fifty varieties of ogham – fifty in each of the first three years of study, and it is clear that most of these are the varieties given in the Ogham Tract (McManus § 7.13, 1991). Macalister sees them as evidence of ogham's cryptic nature, and as serious examples of how the alphabet was used for secret communication. According to McManus, however, the practical benefits of the alphabets are not so clear. The word lists at least may have provided access to an extensive vocabulary classified in a convenient manner, but these are only a small number of the total, and he regards the rest as nothing more than the result of the fascination of the Medieval mind with cryptic alphabets. However, some of the varieties indicate a possible use as property or business records and tallies, and it may be that the many cryptic varieties were deemed worthy of study in themselves as a means of training the mind in the use of words and concepts.

== Word lists ==
A number of word lists, where each letter has an accompanying word, are included in the tract. Macalister regarded these as being used for talking in code, while McManus saw them as simply being a useful way of making lists for classification purposes. The following are some examples:

Enogam/Bird-ogam : besan 'pheasant', lachu 'duck', faelinn 'gull', seg 'hawk', naescu 'snipe', hadaig 'night raven'?, droen 'wren', truith 'starling', querc 'hen', mintan 'titmouse', géis 'swan', ngéigh 'goose', stmólach 'thrush', rócnat 'small rook', aidhircleog 'lapwing', odoroscrach 'scrat'?, uiseog 'lark', ela 'swan', illait 'eaglet'".

Dathogam/Colour-ogam: bán 'white', liath 'grey', flann 'red', sodath 'fine-coloured', necht 'clear', huath 'terrible', dub 'black', temen 'dark grey', cron 'brown', quiar 'mouse-coloured', mbracht 'variegated', gorm 'blue', nglas 'green', sorcha 'bright', ruadh 'red', alad 'piebald', odhar 'dun', usgdha 'resinous', erc 'red', irfind 'very white'.

Ogam tirda/Agricultural ogam: biail 'axe', loman 'rope', fidba 'hedge-bill', srathar 'pack-saddle', nasc 'ring', huartan ?, dabach 'cask', tal 'adze', carr 'waggon', cual 'faggot', machad ?, gat 'with', ngend 'wedge', sust 'flail', rusc 'basket', arathar 'plough', ord 'hammer', usca 'heather-brush', epit 'billhook', indeoin 'anvil'.

Ogam Uisceach/Water Ogam: "Rivulet for group B, to wit one rivulet for B, five for N; Weir for group H, one weir, two, three, four, five weirs (for B, L, F, S, N); River for group M, one river, two, three, four, five rivers (H, D, T, C, Q); Well for group A, one well, two, three, four, five well (for A, O, U, E, I). This list seems to involve counting or tallying and so may have been used in some way as a record of property.

Conogam/Dog Ogham: "Watch-dog for group B, one watch-dog, two, three, four, five watch-dogs ( for B, L, F, S, N);Greyhound for group H, one greyhound, two, three, four, five greyhounds (for H, D, T, C, Q); Herd's dog for group M, one herd's dog, two, three etc.; Lapdog for group A, one lapdog, two, etc." This list also has a numerical element.

Bo-ogam/Cow Ogham: "Milch cow for group B, one milch cow, two, three, etc.; Stripper for group H, one stripper, two, etc.; Three-year-old heifer for group M; Yearling heifer for group A." This list also seems to involve the tally system and so have been used as a record of cattle ownership. (A "stripper" is a cow at the end of her lactation, giving little milk.)

Danogam/Art-ogam: bethumnacht 'livelihood', luamnacht 'pilotage', filideacht 'poetry', sairsi 'handicraft', notaireacht 'notary work', H-airchetul 'trisyllabic poetry', druidheacht 'wizardry', tornoracht 'turning', cruitireacht 'harping', quislenacht 'fluting', milaideacht 'soldiering', gaibneacht 'smithwork', ngibae 'modelling', sreghuindeacht 'deer-stalking', ronnaireacht 'dispensing', airigeacht 'sovereignty', ogmoracht 'harvesting', umaideacht 'brasswork', enaireacht 'fowling', iascaireacht no ibroracht 'fishing or yew-wood work'.

== Miscellaneous alphabets ==
The tract also contains a number of alphabets that perform an assortment of uses. Some of these are as follows:

Macogam/Boy ogam: This is a technique for divining the sex of an unborn child. The name of the pregnant woman "is divided there unless she bear a child previously. If however she bear a child previously, it is the child's name that is divided there; and if there be a letter over, it is a boy. If it be an even number, it would be a daughter that will be born of that pregnancy." This seems to mean that a name with an odd number of letters foretells a boy, an even number a girl.

Cossogam/Foot-ogam: This describes a way of signing ogham using the fingers against the leg. "The fingers of the hand about the shinbone for the letters and to put them on the right of the shinbone for group B. To the left for group H. Athwart the shinbone for group M. Straight across for group A, viz, one finger for the first letter of the group, two for the second letter, till it would reach five for the fifth letter of whichever group it be."

Sronogam/Nose-ogam: This is the same as foot-ogam except the nose is used instead of the leg. "The fingers of the hands about the nose viz, similiter to right and left, athwart, across.

Basogam/palm of hand ogam: manus aliam percutit lignorum. i.e. 'palm of hand variously strikes wood'. No other detail is given.

Cend a muine/Head in Bush: This involves writing a letter to stand in for the whole letter name at the beginning of a word when possible e.g., to write simply CLE for certle or 'ball of thread'.

Cend fo muine/Head under bush: This is the opposite of the above, where the letter stands in for the name at the end of a word e.g. MAELR for Maelruis

== Cryptic varieties ==
The following are some of the more interesting examples of the cryptic ogham varieties (numbering as per Calder):

No. 1 Aradach Fionn/Fionn's Ladder: In this variety each letter has its own vertical stemline. This form of Ogham inspired the theory that Ogham was first invented as a means of musical notation. According to Sean O'Boyle in his book 'Ogam: The Poet's Secret', Fionn's Ladder could be used as a fingering notation, a tablature to guide the player's hand through the range of the harp. O'Boyle's case has been examined from a musicological standpoint by Máire Egan (1983). While it is certain that Ogham was first designed as a system of writing and not for recording music; it is still possible that Ogham could have been used for musical notation after its invention. However, according to Egan, the lack of evidence of how exactly the traditional Irish harp was played means that the case cannot be proved one way or another.

runogam na fian, the "secret ogham of warriors"

No. 11 Runogam na fian/Secret ogam of warriors

No. 14 Ogam Bricrenn /Ogham of Bricrenn This follows the principle of one dot for B . two dots for L .. three dots for F ... and so on right up to twenty dots for I. A short composition then appears in this rather laborious system. Macalister could make neither head nor tail of it, and declared it to be an ancient fragment of druidic lore. However, Meroney re-examined the verse and found it to be a ditty about a poet bemoaning his poor choice of affordable drink!

- Uisge slébi ním sása
- coibche gon gére n-gnúsa
- deoc daim duinn techtas blusar
- bes lúsar gen go lúsa
- 'Mountain water does not satisfy me
- a boon that makes me pull a wry face
- drink of a brown deer that bellows
- maybe it enjoys it, but I do not'

This alphabet is named after Briciu, the satirical poet in the court of the Ulster king Conchubar Mac Neasa, famed for his wicked tongue and skill in fomenting trouble.

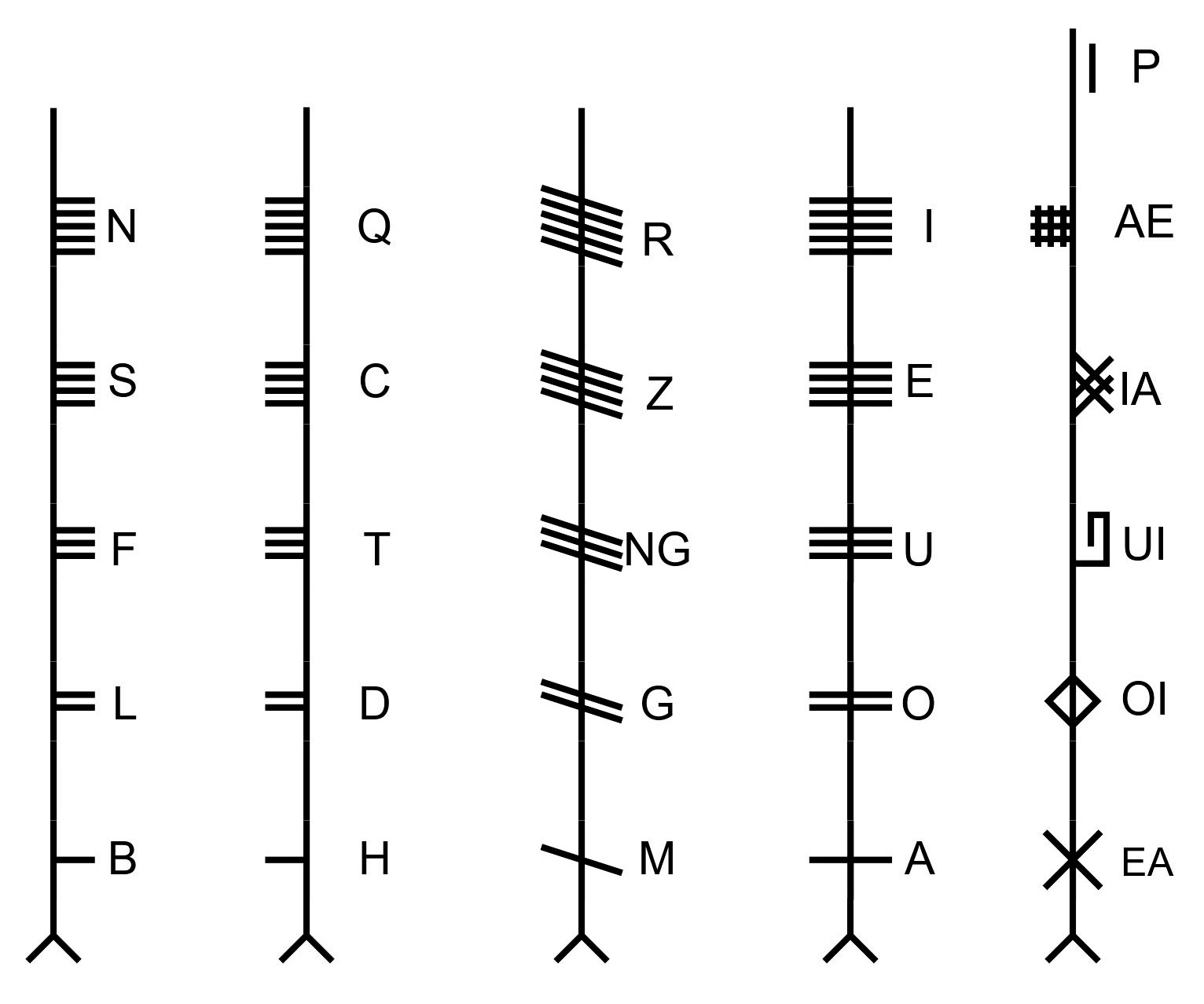
The twenty standard letters of the Ogham alphabet and six forfeda. This is the vertical writing of Ogham; in the horizontal form, the right side would face downward.

No. 17 Ogam adlenfid/Letter Rack Ogham: This variety involves a single score against the stemline in the manner of the appropriate aicme, with as many horizontal strokes at the end of it as needed for the letter. It is very similar to no. 51, except that the strokes are put at the end of the score.

No. 19 Crad Cride Ecis/ Anguish of a Poet's Heart: This variety involves a rectangular figure laid against the stemline in the appropriate manner for the aicme, with as many projecting scores from its top as needed for the letter. It is hard to see what makes this alphabet more a cause of anguish than many of the others, but at least the name shows that a sense of humour is in operation.

No. 23 Foraicimib 7 Deachaib/ Extra Groups and Syllables: Bacht, lact, fect, sect, nect; huath, drong, tect, caect, quiar; maei, gaeth, ngael, strmrect, rect; ai, ong, ur, eng, ing. These are supplementary lists of syllables which the Oghamist had to learn as part of his grammatical training. Several of the alphabets are lists of this kind.

No. 32 Ogam Dedanach/ Final Ogham: The last letter of the name (of the letter) is written instead of the letter i.e. E for B, S for L, N for F, L for S, N for N and so on. This is a form of the alphabet intended for use as a code.

No. 33. Cend ar Nuaill/ Head on Proscription: The last letter of every group is written for the first letter, and the first letter of every group for the last letter, i.e. N for B, and B for N, and every letter for its fellow in the whole group, i.e. L for S and S for L and so on. Many of the alphabets are variations on this theme of swapping the value of the letters around.

No. 35 Ogam Buaidir Foranna/ Ogham of Uproar of Anger: For Group B, the first letter of the group i.e. B, one to five times for each of the letters; for Group H, the second letter of the group i.e. D, one to five times for each of the letters, and so on. Perhaps the intriguing name of this alphabet stems from the frustration of the reader trying to make sense of anything written in it!

No. 40 Brec Mor/ Great Dotting: This variety involves a single score against the stemline in the appropriate manner for the aicme, followed by as many dots less one as there are scores needed for the letter, e.g. the letter F has one score beneath the stemline, followed by two dots.

No. 51 Ogam Dedad/Ogham of Dedu: This variety involves a single score against the stemline in the appropriate manner for the aicme with as many short horizontal lines running out of its right side as there are scores needed for the letter. It is very similar to No. 17, except that the lines are put in the centre of the score. The Dedu (Clanna Dedad) is another name for the Érainn, the tribal grouping which gave their name to Ireland.

No. 63 Ogam Erimon/Ogham of Erimon: In this variety there are angles or 'V' shapes, against the stemline in the appropriate manner for the aicme, with one laid on top of another from one to five as needed. This alphabet is named after Erimon, son of Mil, leader of the Milesians. He was the first king to rule all of Ireland after the arrival of the Milesians, and was regarded as the ancestor of the Gaelic people.

No. 64 Ogam Snaithi Snimach/ Ogham of Interwoven Thread: In this variety, instead of strokes there are 'X' shapes, with one laid on top of another from one to five in a similar manner to the symbol for the forfid Emancholl.

No. 66 Nathair fria Fraech/ Snake through Heather: In this alphabet a wavy line is drawn which weaves above and below the letters like a snake.

ogam airenach, the "shield ogham"

No. 73 Ogam Airenach/ Shield Ogham:

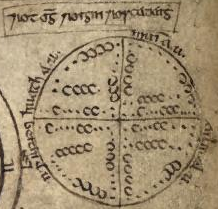
rothogam roigni roscadhaig, the "wheel ogham of Roigne Roscadach"

No. 74 Rothogam Roigni Roscadhaig/Wheel Ogham of Roigne Roscadach: The name Roigne Roscadach means 'Choicest Rhetoric' so again there is a link with poetry. This ogham looks like a wooden wheel or shield, with the letter c repeated to look like bosses or pegs.

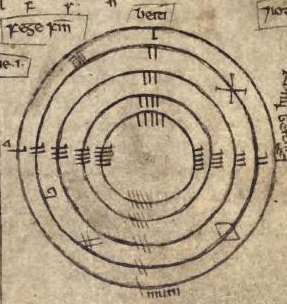
fege finn "Finn's Window"

No. 75 Fege Find/Fionn's Window: This variety has the novelty of arranging the letters attractively in a series of circles. The word fege also means a ridgepole used to hold up a house. Perhaps the alphabet is meant to invoke the image of a circular Iron Age house. The alphabet is named after the great Gaelic warrior of legend Fionn mac Cumhaill.

No. 76 Traig Sruth Ferchertne/Strand Stream of Ferchertne: This time the letters are arranged in a series of squares. Ferchertne was a famous mythical poet of ancient Ireland who epitomised the excellence of the poet's craft. He was credited with writing part of the Scholar's Primer dealing with poetry. According to Ó hÓgáin, so great were Ferchertne's poetic powers that it was said that 'the lakes and rivers drain before him when he satirises, and they rise up when he praises them'. Perhaps this explains the name 'Strand Stream' which can also be read as the 'Ebb Stream of Ferchertne'.

No. 83 Traig Sruth Ferchertne /Strand Stream of Ferchertne: This alphabet has the same name as No. 76 above and is followed by a verse addressed to Nere, the quintessential judge of Irish Poets. McManus provides the following translation from the original Irish which is very obscure:

- 'O splendid famous judging Nere,
- If you treat of pure Ogham,
- I can name straight off in rapid words
- Every unfamiliar variation of Ogham,
- Of which you inquire in fitting questions.
- For you are a multi-skilled luminary
- Of the thrice fifty varied Oghams
- Set at the time of primary study'.

No. 88 Ogam Cuidechtach/Company Ogam: This is a word list similar to the ones for birds, colours etc. Thus: Bachlaid (Priests), Laichesa (Heroines), Fianna (Warriors), Senada (Synods), Noeim (Saints) and so on. The author did not go beyond the first five letters.

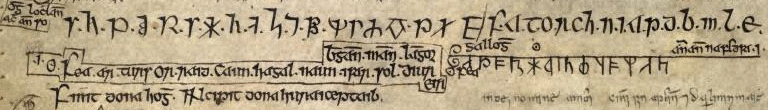
ogam lochlannach, the "Scandinavian ogham" (Futhark)

No. 91 Ogam Lochlannach/Scandinavian Ogam
