= Auraicept na n-Éces =

Early Irish codex

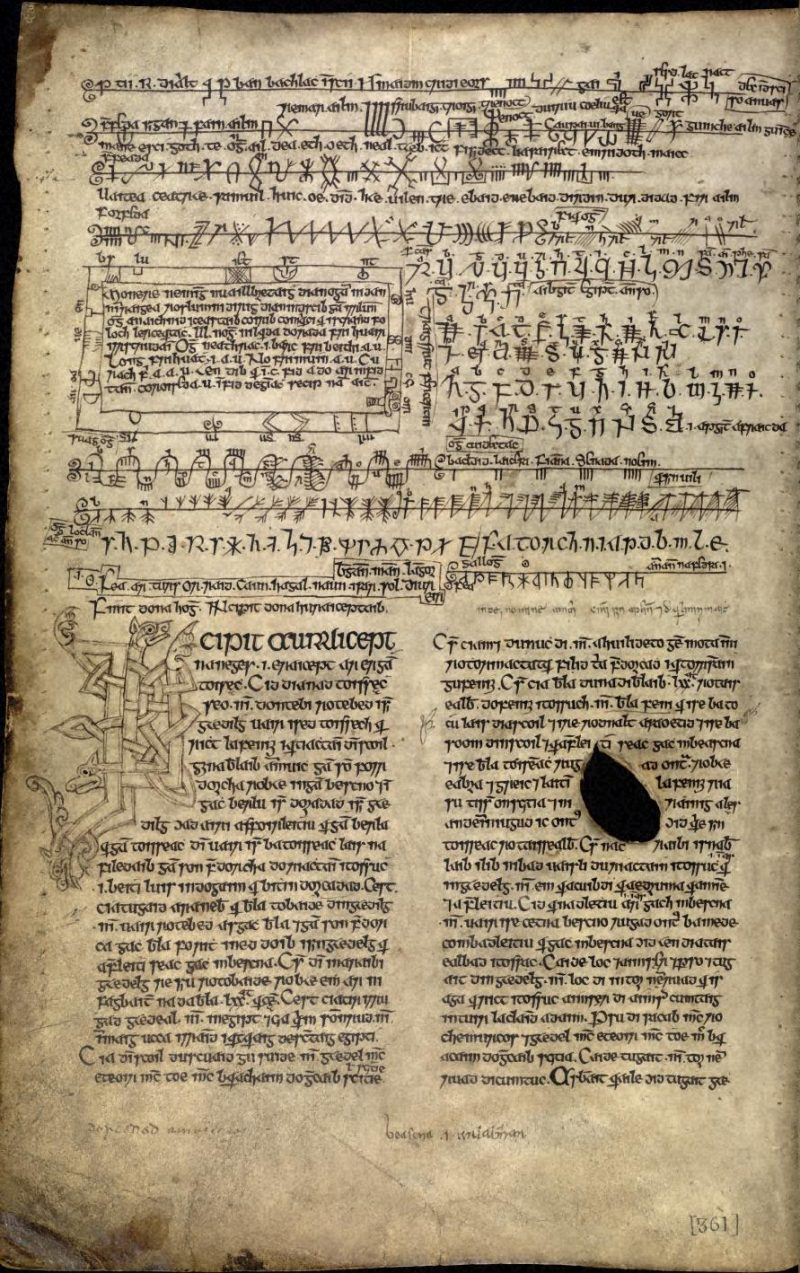
fol. 170v of the Book of Ballymote, the Incipit of the Auraicept.

Auraicept na nÉces (Old Irish: [ˈœɾikʲept̪ n̪a ˈn̠ʲeːgʲes]; "The Scholars' Primer") is an Old Irish text on language and grammar. The core of the text may date to the early eighth century, but much material was added between that date and the production of the earliest surviving copies from the end of the fourteenth century. The text is the first instance of a defence of a western European vernacular, defending the spoken Irish language over Latin, predating Dante's De vulgari eloquentia by several hundred years.

== Manuscripts ==
1. TCD H 2.16. (Yellow Book of Lecan), 14th century
2. RIA 23 P 12 (Book of Ballymote), foll. 169r–180r, ca. 1390

== Contents ==
The Auraicept consists of four books,

1. The Book of Fenius Farsaidh
2. The Book of Amergin
3. The Book of Fercheirtne Filidh
4. The Book of Cennfaeladh

The author argues from a comparison of Gaelic grammar with the materials used in the constructions of the Tower of Babel:

Others affirm that in the tower there were only nine materials and that these were clay and water, wool and blood, wood and lime, pitch, linen, and bitumen ... These represent noun, pronoun, verb, adverb, participle, conjunction, preposition, interjection

As pointed out by Eco (1993), Gaelic was thus argued to be the only instance of a language that overcame the confusion of tongues, being the first language that was created after the fall of the tower by the seventy-two wise men of the school of Fenius, choosing all that was best in each language to implement in Irish. Calder notes (p. xxxii) that the poetic list of the "72 races" was taken from a poem by Luccreth moccu Chiara.

== Ogham ==
The Auraicept is one of the three main sources of the manuscript tradition about Ogham, the others being In Lebor Ogaim and De dúilib feda na forfed. A copy of In Lebor Ogaim immediately precedes the Auraincept in the Book of Ballymote, but instead of the Bríatharogam Con Culainn given in other copies, there follows a variety of other "secret" modes of ogham. The Younger Futhark are also included, as ogam lochlannach "ogham of the Norsemen".

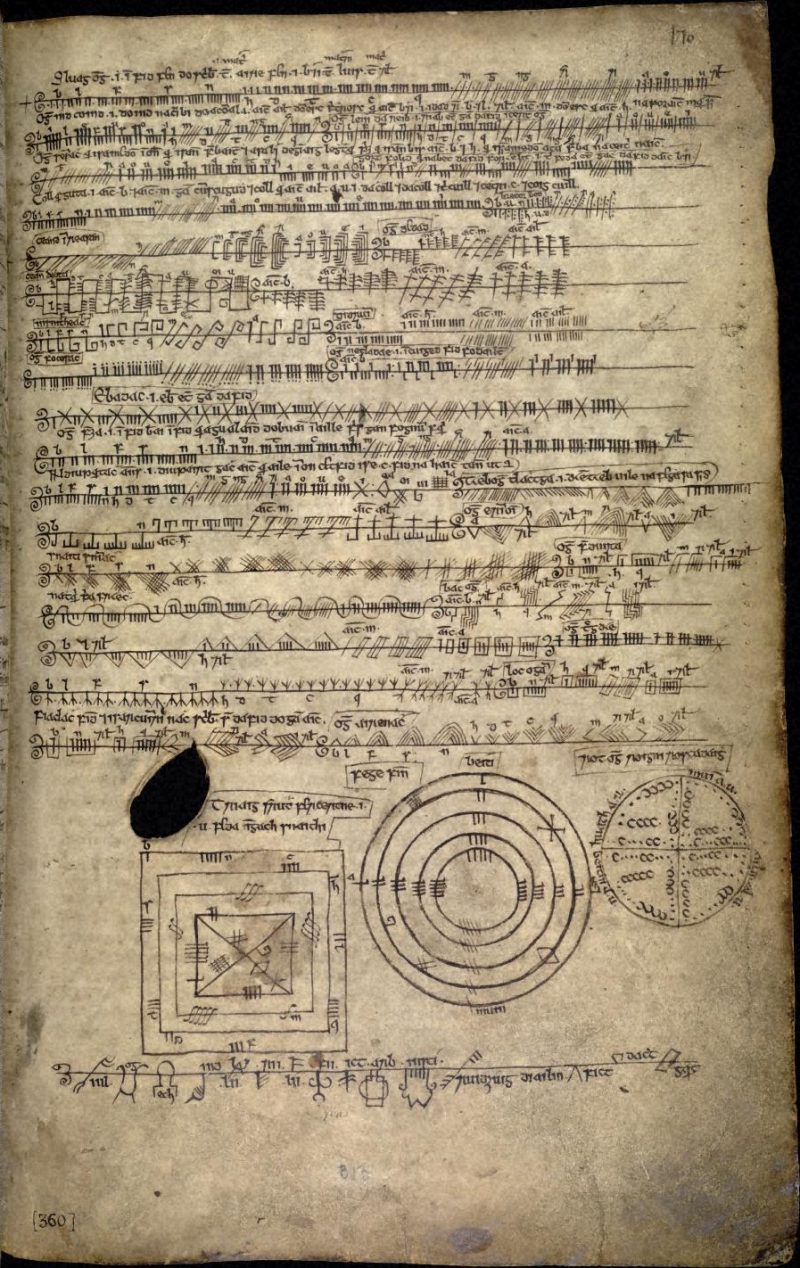
fol. 170r of the Book of Ballymote, variants of ogham, nr. 43 (sluagogam) to nr. 77 (sigla).

Similar to the argument of the precedence of the Gaelic language, the Auraicept claims that Fenius Farsaidh discovered four alphabets, the Hebrew, Greek and Latin ones, and finally the ogham, and that the ogham is the most perfected because it was discovered last. The text is the origin of the tradition that the ogham letters were named after trees, but it gives an alternative possibility that the letters are named for the 25 members of Fenius' school.

In the translation of Calder (1917),

This is their number: five Oghmic groups, i.e., five men for each group, and one up to five for each of them, that their signs may be distinguished. These are their signs: right of stem, left of stem, athwart of stem, through stem, about stem. Thus is a tree climbed, to wit, treading on the root of the tree first with thy right hand first and thy left hand after. Then with the stem, and against it and through it and about it. (Lines 947-951)

In the translation of McManus:

This is their number: there are five groups of ogham and each group has five letters and each of them has from one to five scores and their orientations distinguish them. Their orientations are: right of the stemline, left of the stemline, across the stemline, through the stemline, around the stemline. Ogham is climbed as a tree is climbed

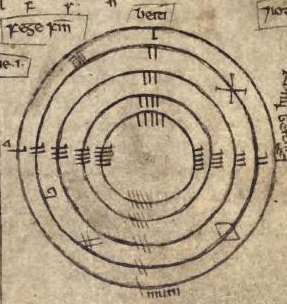
Fege finn

== Bibliography ==
- Acken, James (2008). Structure and Interpretation in the Auraicept na nÉces. Saarbrücken: VDM Verlag Dr. Müller e.K. ISBN 978-3-639-02030-4.
- Ahlqvist, Anders (1982). The early Irish linguist: An edition of the canonical part of the Auraicept na n-Éces with introduction, commentary, and indices. Helsinki: Soc. Scientiarum Fennica.
- Eco, Umberto (1995) [1993]. La Ricerca della Lingua Perfetta nella Cultura Europea [The search for the perfect language]. Translated by Fentress, James. Blackwell. ISBN 0631174656. LCCN 94029141.
- Eco, Umberto (1998). Serendipities: Language and Lunacy. Translated by Weaver, William. New York: Columbia University Press. ISBN 0231111347. LCCN 98007935.
- Engesland, Nicolai Egjar (2020). Auraicept na nÉces: A Diachronic Study. With an Edition from the Book of Uí Mhaine (PhD thesis). University of Oslo.
- McManus, Damian (1997). A Guide to Ogam. Maynooth monographs. Vol. 4. Maynooth: An Sagart. ISBN 9781870684750. OCLC 46009353.
- Poppe, Erich (1996). "Die mittelalterliche irische Abhandlung Auraicept na nÉces und ihr geistesgeschichtlicher Standort". In von Klaus, D. Dutz; Niederehe, Hans-J. (eds.). Theorie und Rekonstruktion. Münster: Nodus. pp. 55–74.
- Poppe, Erich (1995–1997). "Natural and Artificial Gender in Auraicept na nÉces". Studia Hibernica (29): 195–203.
- Poppe, Erich (1999). "Latinate Terminology in Auraicept na nÉces". In Cram, David; Linn, Andrew; Nowak, Elke (eds.). History of Linguistics, 1996. Studies in the History of the Language Sciences. Vol. 1: Traditions in Linguistics Worldwide. John Benjamins. pp. 191–201. doi:10.1075/sihols.94.24pop. ISBN 978-90-272-4582-3.
- Poppe, Erich (2002). "The Latin Quotations in Auraicept na nÉces: Microtexts and their Transmission". In Ní Chatháin, Próinséas; Richter, Michael (eds.). Ireland and Europe in the Early Middle Ages. Texts and Transmission. Dublin: Four Courts. pp. 296–312.
- Thurneysen, Rudolf (1928). "Auraicept na n-Éces". Zeitschrift für Celtische Philologie. 17: 277–303. doi:10.1515/zcph.1928.17.1.277.

== Editions ==
- Calder, George, ed. (1995) [1917]. Auraicept na n-Éces : the scholars' primer; being the texts of the Ogham tract from the Book of Ballymote and the Yellow Book of Lecan, and the text of the Trefhocul from the Book of Leinster (Repr. [d. Ausg.] Edinburgh 1917. ed.). Blackrock: Four Courts Press. ISBN 1-85182-181-3. Archived from the original on 4 September 2006.
