= Charles Swainson (naturalist) =

English cleric and naturalist

- Born: 1840; Northamptonshire, England
- Died: 1913 (aged 71–72)
- Education: B.A, M.A
- Alma mater: Christ Church, Oxford University
- Spouse: Isabel Augusta Gossip

Charles Swainson (1840–1913) M.A. was an English cleric and naturalist. He was rector of High Hurst Wood, Sussex, from 1872 to 1874, from where he published his Handbook of Weather Folk-Lore which also included folklore and mythology relating to elements of nature and a short chapter on birds.

As Rector of St Luke's, Old Charlton, Kent, from 1874 to 1908, he published his best-known and most influential work, Provincial Names and Folk-Lore of British Birds, which collected the vernacular and regional names of British birds together with an array of British and European folklore related to birds. The 1885 edition (Provincial Names and Folk-Lore...) was published within the Dialect Society's blue cover papers, and the 1886 edition (The Folk-Lore and Provincial Names...), with the title slightly changed for emphasis, was published in the Folk-Lore Society's brown cloth covers.

Charles Swainson has been confused with his relative William Swainson, a zoologist and ornithologist after whom several species of birds were named (e.g. Swainson's thrush), and with Charles Anthony Swainson, a theologian.

== Personal life ==
Swainson was born on 27 December 1840 in Crick, Northamptonshire, England to Rev. Charles Litchfield Swainson, who was then Rector of St Margaret of Antioch, Crick, and Harriet Littledale (née France). His parents married in 1838; his mother was the widow of George Decimus Littledale of Sandown House, near Liverpool, who died in 1826 leaving her with three children. He was educated at Harrow School from September 1854 to December 1859, took a B.A. degree from Christ Church, Oxford, in 1863 and was ordained a deacon in 1864, spending less than a year at Wilton in Wiltshire, not far from Salisbury. He was ordained a priest in 1865, and moved to Crick to serve his father's parish as curate.

He married Isabel Augusta Gossip at Doncaster, Yorkshire, in April 1865, and they had four children: Isabel, George, Harriet and Charles.

He took an M.A. degree in 1866 and remained in Crick until 1871, when his father died. In 1872 he moved to High Hurstwood in Sussex, near Buxted and Uckley, where he remained for two years and published his first work, on weather-lore, in 1873.

In 1874 he was presented to the parish of St Luke's, Old Charlton, near Greenwich, east of London, where he remained until 1908 and where he prepared the manuscript for his seminal book on the Provincial Names and Folk-Lore of British Birds (1885–6). He contributed to his local Society of Antiquities in Woolwich on the subject of the treasures in his Old Charlton parish of St Luke's. In 1908 he left Charlton at the age of 67 and moved to a residence nearby, spending time in Torquay with his daughter Harriet in 1911. He died on 30 December 1913 at the age of 72.

== Provincial Names and Folk-lore of British Birds ==
Swainson was a member of the English Dialect Society, and of The Folklore Society, took Notes and Queries, and communicated with one of the ornithological luminaries of his day, John Alexander Harvie-Brown. He drew on regional English, Scottish, Welsh and Irish dialects and traditions as well as from continental European cultures and languages - particularly German and French - and from other world cultures for his collection of vernacular names and common beliefs about aspects of natural history, particularly birds. In his introduction to Birds he thanks G Laurence Gomme (of The Folklore Society and English Dialect Society) for reading the proofs and assisting with the publication of the work, and acknowledges Harvie-Brown for information, comments and corrections relating to Scottish birds.

He modelled the scheme of his Birds book on Rolland's La Faune Populaire de la France. His work was reviewed in the respected scientific and literary journals The Athenaeum, Nature, and The Academy in 1887, and the interest excited by his newly published work prompted a correspondent to the Ceylon Observer to collect from local people some dialect names and folk-lore about Sri Lanka's birds, which were noted in the journal Nature.

Swainson drew on sources from as faras Norway, Iceland, France, Germany, and Russia; relied on the ornithological histories of Bewick and Yarrell; referred to the poetry of John Clare and the works of Shakespeare; drew examples from the lives of the saints and the legends of the Middle Ages; and referred to local English, Scottish and Irish glossaries and collections or provincial names for the birds. Many proverbs, songs and sayings illuminate and illustrate the natural history, which in turn gives substance and meaning to the folklore and rituals he describes. The whole is a treasure trove of much culture and wisdom, now lost, and of much superstition, now superseded by science.

Some anonymous criticisms in these reviews were taken up by Harry Kirke Swann and to some extent addressed in his own Dictionary; mainly, the possibility of dialect words having been omitted, the inclusion of "book-names", the lack of precise reference to Yarrell's 4th edition (edited by Alfred Newton and Howard Saunders in 1885), and the lack of etymological consistency, in that the root or meaning of all names are not worked out to their origins. The criticisms were mainly unwarranted in that Swainson did not set out to write a dictionary, nor an etymology, may not have been able to include references to Yarrell's 4th edition (which was published as he was preparing his own book for publication, and was in ill-health), and had no compunction about including "book-names" as part of the record.

== Legacy and influence ==
=== On W W Skeat and Joseph Wright: the English Dialect Dictionary ===
The English Dialect Society gave a mixed review to Swainson's work upon its publication in 1886. While acknowledging that "the list of local names is the best yet published", they expressed the reservation that Swainson apparently had not consulted any of the Society's own publications, and they concluded that many local or dialect names may have been omitted. They expressed a hope that his work would be built upon. In the same year the Society's founder and president, Professor Walter William Skeat, (author of an etymological dictionary on the Anglo-Saxon roots of the English language, and one of the leading philologists of his time), initiated a fund mainly from his own resources in order to set up a new project which would bring the work of the Society to its fulfilment. All 80 published volumes of the Society would be included in The English Dialect Dictionary, and its compiler, Joseph Wright, a self-taught philologist, would involve a nationwide network of almost a thousand volunteers to assist and contribute to this massive cultural undertaking.

Swainson's work on weather-lore and on provincial birds' names and folk-lore was included in the massive undertaking which became The English Dialect Dictionary, published in six volumes between 1898 and 1905. It was dedicated to Professor Skeat, who had contributed so much to its inception. "It was no longer necessary to carry on the work of the English Dialect Society", as Wright says in his preface to the dictionary, and so, in 1896, it was disbanded.

Walter William Skeat also references Swainson's work in his "Magic Rites Connected With The Several Departments of Nature", a chapter in the book "Malay Magic: Being an Introduction to The Folklore and Popular Religion of the Malay Peninsula", published in 1900, where he quotes Swainson's research on the nightjar's connection to the Gabriel Hounds or Gabble Ratchet myths.

Two major works on birds' names followed which cite Swainson as a major source: Harry Kirke Swann's dictionary of bird names, folk-names and lore (1913), which cites Swainson's work ahead of all other sources as "the first work approaching the scheme of the present volume", and Lockwood's Oxford dictionary of bird names (1984), which cites The English Dialect Dictionary, and Swainson's list of provincial names which it contains, as the second of its chief sources.

=== On H Kirke Swann: A Dictionary of English & Folk-names of British Birds ===
Charles Swainson's original and compendious research formed the foundation of several subsequent major works of ornithological literature, including Harry Kirke Swann's A Dictionary of English and Folk-Names of British Birds; with their History, Meaning and First Usage, and the Folk-Lore, Weather-Lore, Legends Etc Relating to the More Familiar Species.

Swann pays tribute to Charles Swainson in the first part of his introduction, and subsequently mentions other major works he has made use of, from Turner (1544) to Ray and Willughby (1678). He refers throughout his work to Swainson's names and derivations, and paraphrases parts of Swainson's original collection in his dictionary, published in the year of Swainson's death in 1913. An example of this practice is given in his article on the Redbreast (pp 189–190), where he briefly summarises parts of the Redbreast article (pp 13–18) in Swainson, which consists of original detailed research which is attributed, analysed and contextualised.

Swann, in the Preface to his dictionary, describes Swainson as sourcing and describing the meanings of over 2000 bird names, where Alfred Newton, an authority on ornithology, and a member of the ornithological "establishment", had described "a great many less" in his Dictionary of Birds (1893). Kirke Swann claims to have covered about 5000 names in his own 1913 dictionary, but admits that this number includes variations or alternative spellings.

Swann offers his view that Swainson's work suffers somewhat by not being laid out like a dictionary. As Swainson avers in his Preface, his work follows the classification and nomenclature of the List of British Birds set out by a Committee of the British Ornithologists' Union, London, 1883.

Swann also offers his view that Swainson does not attempt to deal with the important matter of book-names of species. Swainson's provincial and vernacular names are all grouped under the heading of the accepted name for each species, as listed by the authoritative BOU.

In his Bibliography of Ornithology from the Earliest Times to the End of 1912, Kirke Swann pens a biographical note about Swainson and on pp 566–567 says "his 'Provincial Names and Folk-Lore of British Birds' has always been held in high esteem as a valuable contribution to the literature of ornithology".

=== On W B Lockwood's Oxford Dictionary of Bird Names ===
William Burley Lockwood, in his Oxford Dictionary of Bird Names goes so far as to name his two main sources in this way: "The following books have been our chief sources: Firstly, the Oxford English Dictionary, 1884-1933, and its Supplement, 1972-, with its rich documentation reaching back to the earliest period of the language... Next, the English Dialect Dictionary, 1898-1905, a great repository of local names known to have been in use since 1700; it incorporates the collection found in Swainson's Provincial Names ... of British Birds, 1885."

Lockwood also references Swainson's work in his etymological research, for example in "The Philology of 'Auk' and related matters" in the journal Neuephilologische Mitteilungen vol. 79, no.4 (1978) which explores the roots of the word "auk" and related names of the Alcidae family (guillemots, razorbills and auks).

=== On Francesca Greenoak: British Birds: Their Folklore, Names and Literature and recent authors ===
Swainson is still widely referenced today as an authoritative and reliable source, for example by Francesca Greenoak in her British Birds; their Folklore, Names and Literature (1997) which was originally published by Andre Deutsch in 1979 as All the Birds of the Air, and by Stephen Moss Mrs Moreau's Warbler; How Birds Got Their Names which treats principally of eponymous bird names, and of the people these names refer to. Moss also includes lengthy quotations which he attributes erroneously to Charles Swainson; these are in fact attributable to William Swainson (on Latham and the merits of his works and of his memory, p 144 and p 320).

Bob Montgomery of the American Ornithological Society in his 2017 article Bird Names Then and Now credits Charles Swainson with compiling "the names of common birds from both folklore and regional dialects across England and Scotland, and several books have since been published on the sources of common names in use today".

=== On research into etymology, philology, comparative mythology, natural history, literature & poetry ===
Articles published in journals which refer to Swainson's works include:

- Bird Folklore from Roanoke Island, North Carolina (Journal of American Folklore, 1947);
- The Image of the Halcyon Kingfisher in Mediaeval Chinese Poetry (Journal of the American Oriental Society, 1984);
- Chaucer's Archangel (Modern Languages Notes, 1940);
- Langland's "Corlew": Another Look at 'Piers Plowman', (Medium Aevum, 1993).
- Birds In The Poetry of Browning, (The Review of English Studies, 1956)
- The Whistler, Bird of Omen, (Modern Languages Notes, 1950)
- Exeter Book Riddle 57 (55) - a double solution? (Anglo-Saxon England, 1996)
- Notes on Shells from the Shrine of Santa Lucia, near Figueras in Spain (Transactions of the Glasgow Archaeological Society, 1896)
- Little King, Sow, Lady-cow (Journal of American Folklore, 1935)
- Bird-names in Latin Glossaries by W M Lindsay (Notes on the foregoing Article by Professor D'Arcy Wentworth Thompson) Classical Philology, vol 13, no.1, January 1918 p.16
