= Hwair =

Gothic letter of the alphabet

Form of the Gothic letter

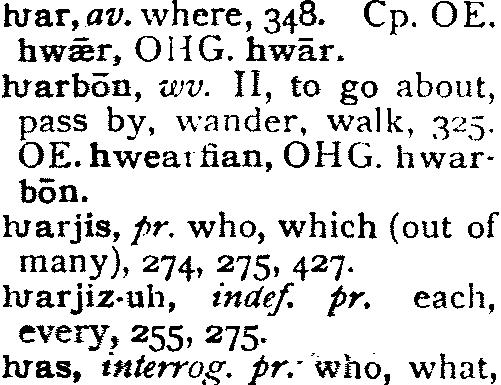
Some words with Hwair, in Joseph Wright's Grammar of the Gothic Language (1910)

Hwair (also ƕair, huuair, hvair) is the name of 𐍈, the Gothic letter expressing the [hʷ] or [ʍ] sound (reflected in English by the inverted wh-spelling for [ʍ]). Hwair is also the name of the Latin ligature ƕ (capital Ƕ) used to transcribe Gothic.

== Name ==
The name of the Gothic letter is recorded by Alcuin in Codex Vindobonensis 795 as uuaer. The meaning of the name ƕair was probably "cauldron, pot" (cf. ƕairnei "skull"); comparative reconstruction shows *kʷer- ("a kind of dish or pot") in Proto-Indo-European.

There was no Elder Futhark rune for the phoneme, so that unlike those of most Gothic letters, the name does not continue the name of a rune (but see Qairþra).

== Sound ==
Gothic ƕ is the reflex of Common Germanic *xʷ, which in turn continues the Indo-European labiovelar *kʷ after it underwent Grimm's law. The same phoneme in Old English and Old High German is spelled hw (Modern English wh).

== Transliteration ==
The Gothic letter is transliterated with the Latin ligature of the same name, ƕ, which was introduced by Wilhelm Braune in the 1882 edition of Gotische Grammatik, as suggested in a review of the 1880 edition by Hermann Collitz, to replace the digraph hv which was formerly used to express the phoneme, e.g. by Migne (vol. 18) in the 1860s. It is used, for example, in Dania transcription. It was also used to represent the voiceless labial–velar fricative [ʍ] in a 1921 edition of the International Phonetic Alphabet.

== Related letters and other similar characters ==
- ʘ : IPA letter bilabial click
- Ԋ ԋ : Komi Nje, a letter in the Molodtsov alphabet
- Ꙩ ꙩ : Cyrillic letter monocular O
- ん : N (kana)
- Խ խ : Armenian Khe

== Character encodings ==
character	𐍈		Ƕ		ƕ	
Unicode name	GOTHIC LETTER HWAIR	GOTHIC LETTER HWAIR	LATIN CAPITAL LETTER HWAIR	LATIN CAPITAL LETTER HWAIR	LATIN SMALL LETTER HV	LATIN SMALL LETTER HV
character encoding	decimal	hexadecimal	decimal	hexadecimal	decimal	hexadecimal
Unicode	66376	10348	502	01F6	405	0195
UTF-8	240 144 141 136	F0 90 8D 88	199 182	C7 B6	198 149	C6 95
Numeric character reference	&#66376;	&#x10348;	&#502;	&#x01F6;	&#405;	&#x0195;

Note that the Unicode names of the Latin letters are different: "Hwair" and "Hv".

== See also ==
- Phonological history of wh
- Wh (digraph)
