= Monocular (disambiguation) =

A monocular is a modified refracting telescope.

Monocular may also refer to:

- Monocular vision, vision in which each eye is used separately.
- Monocular O, a variant of Cyrillic letter O

== See also ==
- Monocle
