= Gothic verbs =

Language component

Gothic verbs have the most complex conjugation of any attested Germanic language. Most categories reconstructed for the Proto-Germanic verb system are preserved in Gothic. Knowledge of the Proto-Germanic verb is itself to a large degree based on Gothic, meaning that its reconstruction may be fragmentary.

In conjugations, note that stem-final -b- /β/ and -d- /ð/ change spelling and pronunciation to become -f /ɸ/ and -þ /θ/ respectively at the end of a word. Stem final -g- /ɣ/ also presumably became /x/, but the spelling does not change. Similarly, verb stems ending in -ái-, -áu-, -ē-, -iu-, and -ō- become -aj-, -aw, -ai-, -iw, and -au- respectively, before vowels. Expected *áij, *áuw, and *iuw are always simplified into ái, áu, and iu (respectively).

== Voice ==
=== Passive voice ===
Gothic retains a morphological passive voice inherited from the Indo-European medio-passive, but only in the present indicative and optative (the past tense uses periphrasis). This contrasts a present tense such as gibada ("is being given") with a past tense gibans was* ("was given, has been given"). In other Germanic languages, there are only rare survivals of the morphological passive, such as Old English hātte ("am called"). The Gothic infinitive did not indicate active or passive voice and is sometimes employed to translate Greek passive infinitives.

In the attested corpus of Gothic, passive forms are frequent only in the third person, and for weak verbs, mostly in class 1. The periphrastic passive consists of a participle, which agrees with the subject in gender and number, and a helping verb. The helping verb varies by aspect: wisan ("to be") creates a stative passive (gibans was*, "was given, has been given"), whereas the verb wairþan ("to become") creates an inchoative passive (gibans warþ, "came to be given, got given").

Class four weak verbs (infinitive in -nan) are agentless and do not take passive forms; they are used to translate Greek passives, and are sometimes referred to as passive as well, although this is not strictly correct.

== Strong verbs ==
Germanic language strong verbs are verbs that change the vowel in the stem to form the past and past participle, rather than add a suffix. For an English example, contrast fall-fell-fallen (strong) from fell-felled (weak).

The following is a table of all the different types and subtypes of strong verbs.

| Strong verb classes | | Stem vowel | | | |
| Class | Subclass | General | Past 1 | Past 2 | Past Participle |
|---|---|---|---|---|---|
| 1 | | ei | ái | i, aí (before h, ƕ, r) | |
| 2 | 2a | iu | áu | u, aú (before h, ƕ, r) | |
| 2 | 2b | ū | áu | u, aú (before h, ƕ, r) | |
| 3 | | i, aí (before h, ƕ, r) | a | u, aú (before h, ƕ, r) | |
| 4 | 4a | i, aí (before h, ƕ, r) | a | ē | u, aú |
| 4 | 4b | u, aú (before h, ƕ, r) | a | ē | u, aú |
| 5 | | i, aí (before h, ƕ, r) | a | ē | i, aí (before h, ƕ, r) |
| 6 | | a | ō | | a |
| 7 | 7a | C+a, ā, ái, au, áu, ē, or ō | CaíC+infinitive vowel | | same as infinitive |
| 7 | 7b | C+ai, ē | CaíCō | | same as infinitive |

The "general" stem is used for the present tense, infinitive and imperative. The "past 1" stem is used for the past tense indicative singular, and the "past 2" is used for the dual and plural indicative past as well as the optative past in all numbers.

Classes 5 and 6 have a small subclass of verbs that use the consonant suffix -j- in the general form, but drop it elsewhere

Reduplicating/ Class 7 strong verbs that begin with a vowel simply add aí- as a prefix, without adding a consonant to reduplicate or separate the "aí" prefix from the stem vowel.

The following strong verbs are extant in Gothic:

- Class 1: beidan "to await" (báiþ), beitan "to bite", digan "to knead", dreiban "to drive" (dráif), greipan "to seize", hneiwan "to bow", bileiban "to remain" (biláif), ga-leiþan "to go", urreisan "to arise", skeinan "to shine", disskreitan "to rend", gasmeitan "to smear", sneiþan "to cut", speiwan "to spit", steigan "to ascend", sweiban "to cease" (swáif), weipan "to crown", inweitan "to worship";
- Class 1, before h, ƕ, r: leiƕan "to lend", ga-teihan "to tell", þeihan "to thrive", þreihan "to press upon", weihan "to fight";
- Class 2a: ana-biudan "to bid" (anabáuþ), biugan "to bend", driugan "to serve as a soldier", driusan "to fall", giutan "to pour", hiufan "to mourn", dishniupan "to break asunder", kiusan "to test", kriustan "to gnash"; liudan "to grow" (láuþ), liugan "to lie", fraliusan "to lose", niutan "to enjoy", siukan "to be sick", af-skiuban "to push aside" (afskáuf), sliupan "to slip", usþriutan "to trouble";
- Class 2a, before h, ƕ, r: tiuhan "to lead", þliuhan "to flee";
- Class 2b: galūkan "to shut";
- Class 3: bindan "to bind", bliggwan "to beat", brinnan "to burn", drigkan "to drink", filhan "to hide", finþan "to find", usgildan "to repay", duginnan "to begin", hilpan "to help", frahinþan "to capture", aflinnan "to depart", rinnan "to run", siggwan "to sing", sigqan "to sink", fraslindan "to swallow up", spinnan "to spin", stigqan "to thrust", swiltan "to die", ana-trimpan "to tread on", atþinsan "to attract", þriskan "to thresh", wilwan "to rob", windan "to wind", winnan "to suffer", gawrisqan "to bear fruit";
- Class 3, before h, ƕ, r: baírgan "to keep", ufgaírdan "to gird up", ƕaírban "to walk", afswaírban "to wipe out", gaþaírsan "to wither", waírpan "to throw", waírþan "to become";
- Class 4a: brikan "to break", niman "to take", qiman "to come", stilan "to steal", ga-timan "to suit";
- Class 4a, before h, ƕ, r: baíran "to bear", ga-taíran "to destroy";
- Class 4b: trudan "to tread";
- Class 5: diwan "to die" (dáu), fitan "to travail in birth", giban "to give" (gaf), bi-gitan "to find", hlifan "to steal", ligan "to lie down", lisan "to gather", mitan "to measure", ganisan "to be saved", niþan "to help", qiþan "to say", rikan "to heap up", sitan "to sit", sniwan "to hasten" (snáu), gawidan "to bind" (gawaþ), gawigan "to shake down", wisan "to be, remain", wrikan "to persecute";
- Class 5, j-present: bidjan "to pray"
- Class 5, irregular: fraíƕnan "to ask"; itan "to eat";
- Class 5; before h, ƕ, r: saíƕan "to see";
- Class 5; before h, ƕ, r; -n- present: fraíhnan "to ask";
- Class 6: alan "to grow", usanan "to expire", ga-daban "to beseem" (gadōf), ga-draban "to hew out" (ga-drōf), ga-dragan "to heap up", faran "to go", graban "to dig" (grōf), af-hlaþan "to lade", malan "to grind", sakan "to rebuke", skaban "to shave" (skōf), slahan "to smite", swaran "to swear", þwahan "to wash", wakan "to wake";
- Class 6, -j- present: fraþjan "to understand", hafjan "to raise", hlahjan "to laugh", ga-raþjan "to count", ga-skapjan "to create", skaþjan "to injure", wahsjan "to grow";
- Class 6, irregular: standan "to stand" (stōþ);
- Class 7a; -a- present: us-alþan "to grow old", blandan "to mix", falþan "to fold", gaggan "to go" (past supplied by iddja), haldan "to hold", anapraggan "to oppress", saltan "to salt", gastaldan "to possess", waldan "to rule";
- Class 7a; -ā- present: fāhan "to seize", hāhan "to hang";
- Class 7a; -ái- present: afáikan "to deny", fráisan "to tempt", háitan "to call", láikan "to leap", máitan "to cut", skáidan "to divide" (skaískáiþ), gaþláihan "to cherish, comforẗ";
- Class 7a; -ē- present: uf-blēsan "to blow up, puff up", slēpan "to sleep";
- Class 7a; -ō- present: blōtan "to worship", *flōkan "to bewail", ƕōpan "to boast";
- Class 7a; -au- present: *lauan "to revile" (*laílō); possibly also *bnauan "to rub", which may be a Class III weak verb (see below);
- Class 7a; -áu- present: áukan "to add", hláupan "to leap", stáutan "to smite";
- Class 7b; -ē- present: grētan "to weep", lētan "to let", garēdan "to reflect upon" (garaírōþ), tēkan "to touch";
- Class 7b; -ai- present: saian "to sow", *waian "to blow".

The following is a sample paradigm of a strong verb, niman "to take" (Class 4):

Strong verb conjugation
| Niman, "to take" | | Indicative | | | | | | Optative | | | | | | Imperative | |
| Niman, "to take" | | Active | | | | Passive | | Active | | | | Passive | | Imperative | |
| Niman, "to take" | | Present | | Past | | Present | | Present | | Past | | Present | | Imperative | |
|---|---|---|---|---|---|---|---|---|---|---|---|---|---|---|---|
| Singular | 1st person | nima | -a | nam | -_ | nimada | -ada | nimáu | -áu | nēmjáu | -jáu | nimáidáu | -áidau | | |
| Singular | 2nd person | nimis | -is | namt | -t | nimaza | -aza | nimáis | -áis | nēmeis | -eis | nimáizáu | -áizáu | nim | -_ |
| Singular | 3rd person | nimiþ | -iþ | nam | -_ | nimada | -ada | nimái | -ái | nēmi | -i | nimáidáu | -áidáu | nimadáu | -adáu |
| Dual | 1st person | nimōs | -ōs | nēmu | -u | — | | nimáiwa | -áiwa | nēmeiwa | -eiwa | — | | — | |
| Dual | 2nd person | nimats | -ats | nēmuts | -uts | — | | nimáits | -áits | nēmeits | -eits | nimats | -ats | nimats | -ats |
| Plural | 1st person | nimam | -am | nēmum | -um | nimanda | -anda | nimáima | -áima | nēmeima | -eima | nimáindáu | -áindáu | nimam | -am |
| Plural | 2nd person | nimiþ | -iþ | nēmuþ | -uþ | nimanda | -anda | nimáiþ | -áiþ | nēmeiþ | -eiþ | nimáindáu | -áindáu | nimiþ | -iþ |
| Plural | 3rd person | nimand | -and | nēmun | -un | nimanda | -anda | nimáina | -áina | nēmeina | -eina | nimáindáu | -áindáu | nimandáu | -andáu |
| Infinitive | | niman (-an) | | | | | | | | | | | | | |
| Present Participle | | nimands (-ands) | | | | | | | | | | | | | |
| Past Participle | | numans (-ans) | | | | | | | | | | | | | |

== Weak verbs ==
Weak verbs in Germanic languages are defined by the past tense being formed by a suffix, rather than the stem vowel changing. In the case of Gothic, further subclasses are defined by the vowel that comes before the past-tense prefix, as well as other forms of the verb. Generally, the present tense, infinitive, and imperative share the same personal suffixes with strong verbs.

The following table outlines the common past-tense suffix between weak verbs; note that a thematic vowel is always used before this suffix:

Weak past-tense suffix
| Subject | | Indicative | Optative |
|---|---|---|---|
| Singular | 1st person | -da | -dēdjáu |
| Singular | 2nd person | -dēs | -dēdeis |
| Singular | 3rd person | -da | -dēdi |
| Dual | 1st person | -dēdu | -dēdeiwa |
| Dual | 2nd person | -dēduts | -dēdeits |
| Plural | 1st person | -dēdum | -dēdeima |
| Plural | 2nd person | -dēduþ | -dēdeiþ |
| Plural | 3rd person | -dēdun | -dēdeina |

=== Class 1 ===
Class 1 verbs are defined by having the thematic vowel -i-; which becomes -j- before vowels and becomes -ei- after long stems before -i-. The following is a sample paradigm of two class 1 weak verbs, nasjan "to save" (short stem-syllable), and sōkjan "to seek" (long stem-syllable; only differing forms shown):

Class 1 weak verb conjugation
| Nasjan, "to save"; Sōkjan, "to seek" | | Indicative | | | | | | Optative | | | | | | Imperative | |
| Nasjan, "to save"; Sōkjan, "to seek" | | Active | | | | Passive | | Active | | | | Passive | | Imperative | |
| Nasjan, "to save"; Sōkjan, "to seek" | | Present | | Past | | Present | | Present | | Past | | Present | | Imperative | |
|---|---|---|---|---|---|---|---|---|---|---|---|---|---|---|---|
| Singular | 1st person | nasja | -ja | nasida | -ida | nasjada | -jada | nasjáu | -jáu | nasidēdjáu | -idēdjáu | nasjáidáu | -jáidáu | | |
| Singular | 2nd person | nasjis/ sōkeis | -jis/ -eis | nasidēs | -idēs | nasjaza | -jaza | nasjáis | -jáis | nasidēdeis | -idēdeis | nasjáizáu | -jáizáu | nasei | -ei |
| Singular | 3rd person | nasjiþ/ sōkeiþ | -jiþ/ -eiþ | nasida | -ida | nasjada | -jada | nasjái | -jái | nasidēdi | -idēdi | nasjáidáu | -jáidáu | nasjadáu | -jadáu |
| Dual | 1st person | nasjōs | -jōs | nasidēdu | -idēdu | — | | nasjáiwa | -jáiwa | nasidēdeiwa | -idēdeiwa | — | | — | |
| Dual | 2nd person | nasjats | -jats | nasidēduts | -idēduts | — | | nasjáits | -jáits | nasidēdeits | -idēdeits | nasjats | -jats | nasjats | -jats |
| Plural | 1st person | nasjam | -jam | nasidēdum | -idēdum | nasjanda | -janda | nasjáima | -jáima | nasidēdeima | -idēdeima | nasjáindáu | -jáindáu | nasjam | -jam |
| Plural | 2nd person | nasjiþ/ sōkeiþ | -jiþ/ -eiþ | nasidēduþ | -idēduþ | nasjanda | -janda | nasjáiþ | -jáiþ | nasidēdeiþ | -idēdeiþ | nasjáindáu | -jáindáu | nasjiþ/ sōkeiþ | -jiþ/ -eiþ |
| Plural | 3rd person | nasjand | -jand | nasidēdun | -idēdun | nasjanda | -janda | nasjáina | -jáina | nasidēdeina | -idēdeina | nasjáindáu | -jáindáu | nasjandáu | -jandáu |
| Infinitive | | nasjan (-jan) | | | | | | | | | | | | | |
| Present Participle | | nasjands (-jands) | | | | | | | | | | | | | |
| Past Participle | | nasiþs (-iþs) | | | | | | | | | | | | | |

Some class 1 verbs have an irregular past due to the fact that the -i- in the past was lost in Proto-Germanic:

Class 1 stem-changing verbs
| General stem | Infinitive | Past stem | Past Participle | Meaning |
|---|---|---|---|---|
| brigg- | briggan | brāht- | *brāhts | "to bring" |
| brūkj- | brūkjan | brūht- | *brūhts | "to use" |
| bugj- | bugjan | baúht- | *baúhts | "to buy" |
| gagg- | gaggan | iddja, gaggida | gaggans | "to go" |
| káupatj- | káupatjan | káupast- | káupatiþs | "to buffet" |
| þagkj- | þagkjan | þāht- | þāhts | "to think" |
| þugkj- | þugkjan | þūht- | þūhts | "to seem" |
| waúrkj- | waúrkjan | waúrht- | waúrhts | "to work" |

- gaggan is properly a Class 7 strong verb. iddja is declined like a weak verb. A weak past gaggida also occurs once.
- briggan is properly a Class 3 strong verb, with other parts taken from a lost verb *braggjan (cf. Old English breng(e)an, Old Saxon brengian).

=== Class 2 ===
Class 2 weak verbs are defined by having the thematic vowel -ō-.

The following is a sample paradigm of a class 2 weak verb, salbōn "to anoint":

Class 2 weak verb conjugation
| Salbōn, "to anoint" | | Indicative | | | | | | Optative | | | | | | Imperative | |
| Salbōn, "to anoint" | | Active | | | | Passive | | Active | | | | Passive | | Imperative | |
| Salbōn, "to anoint" | | Present | | Past | | Present | | Present | | Past | | Present | | Imperative | |
|---|---|---|---|---|---|---|---|---|---|---|---|---|---|---|---|
| Singular | 1st person | salbō | -ō | salbōda | -ōda | salbōda | -ōda | salbō | -ō | salbōdēdjáu | -ōdēdjáu | salbōdáu | -ōdau | | |
| Singular | 2nd person | salbōs | -ōs | salbōdēs | -ōdēs | salbōza | -ōza | salbōs | -ōs | salbōdēdeis | -ōdēdeis | salbōzáu | -ōzáu | salbō | -ō |
| Singular | 3rd person | salbōþ | -ōþ | salbōda | -ōda | salbōda | -ōda | salbō | -ō | salbōdēdi | -ōdēdi | salbōdáu | -ōdáu | salbōdáu | -ōdáu |
| Dual | 1st person | salbōs | -ōs | salbōdēdu | -ōdēdu | — | | salbōwa | -ōwa | salbōdēdeiwa | -ōdēdeiwa | — | | — | |
| Dual | 2nd person | salbōts | -ōts | salbōdēduts | -ōdēduts | — | | salbōts | -ōts | salbōdēdeits | -ōdēdeits | salbōts | -ōts | salbōts | -ōts |
| Plural | 1st person | salbōm | -ōm | salbōdēdum | -ōdēdum | salbōnda | -ōnda | salbōma | -ōma | salbōdēdeima | -ōdēdeima | salbōndáu | -ōndáu | salbōm | -ōm |
| Plural | 2nd person | salbōþ | -ōþ | salbōdēduþ | -ōdēduþ | salbōnda | -ōnda | salbōþ | -ōþ | salbōdēdeiþ | -ōdēdeiþ | salbōndáu | -ōndáu | salbōþ | -ōþ |
| Plural | 3rd person | salbōnd | -ōnd | salbōdēdun | -ōdēdun | salbōnda | -ōnda | salbōna | -ōna | salbōdēdeina | -ōdēdeina | salbōndáu | -ōndáu | salbōndáu | -ōndáu |
| Infinitive | | salbōn (-ōn) | | | | | | | | | | | | | |
| Present Participle | | salbōnds (-ōnds) | | | | | | | | | | | | | |
| Past Participle | | salbōþs (-ōþs) | | | | | | | | | | | | | |

=== Class 3 ===
Class 3 weak verbs are marked by having the vowels -a- and -ái- as the thematic vowels. The two thematic vowels are used differently depending on form, with only -ái- being used in the past tense.

The following is a sample paradigm of a class 3 weak verb, haban "to have":

Class 3 weak verb conjugation
| Haban, "to have" | | Indicative | | | | | | Optative | | | | | | Imperative | |
| Haban, "to have" | | Active | | | | Passive | | Active | | | | Passive | | Imperative | |
| Haban, "to have" | | Present | | Past | | Present | | Present | | Past | | Present | | Imperative | |
|---|---|---|---|---|---|---|---|---|---|---|---|---|---|---|---|
| Singular | 1st person | haba | -a | habáida | -áida | habada | -ada | habáu | -áu | habáidēdjáu | -áidēdjáu | habáidáu | -áidáu | | |
| Singular | 2nd person | habáis | -áis | habáidēs | -áidēs | habaza | -aza | habáis | -áis | habáidēdeis | -áidēdeis | habáizáu | -áizáu | habái | -ái |
| Singular | 3rd person | habáiþ | -áiþ | habáida | -áida | habada | -ada | habái | -ái | habáidēdi | -áidēdi | habáidáu | -áidáu | habadáu | -adáu |
| Dual | 1st person | habōs | -ōs | habáidēdu | -áidēdu | — | | habáiwa | -áiwa | habáidēdeiwa | -áidēdeiwa | — | | — | |
| Dual | 2nd person | habats | -ats | habáidēduts | -áidēduts | — | | habáits | -áits | habáidēdeits | -áidēdeits | habats | -ats | habats | -ats |
| Plural | 1st person | habam | -am | habáidēdum | -áidēdum | habanda | -anda | habáima | -áima | habáidēdeima | -áidēdeima | habáindáu | -áindáu | habam | -am |
| Plural | 2nd person | habáiþ | -áiþ | habáidēduþ | -áidēduþ | habanda | -anda | habáiþ | -áiþ | habáidēdeiþ | -áidēdeiþ | habáindáu | -áindáu | habáiþ | -áiþ |
| Plural | 3rd person | haband | -and | habáidēdun | -áidēdun | habanda | -anda | habáina | -áina | habáidēdeina | -áidēdeina | habáindáu | -áindáu | habandáu | -andáu |
| Infinitive | | haban (-an) | | | | | | | | | | | | | |
| Present Participle | | habands (-ands) | | | | | | | | | | | | | |
| Past Participle | | habáiþs (-áiþs) | | | | | | | | | | | | | |

Class 3 is apparently a closed class, containing only the following verbs:

áistan "to reverence", ana-silan "to be silent", andstaúrran "to murmur against", arman "to pity", bauan "to dwell", fastan "to fast, hold firm", fijan "to hate", gageigan "to gain", gakunnan "to recognize", haban "to have", hatan "to hate", jiukan "to contend", leikan "to please", liban "to live", liugan "to marry", maúrnan "to mourn", munan "to consider", reiran "to tremble", saúrgan "to sorrow", sifan "to rejoice", skaman (sik) "to be ashamed", slawan "to be silent", trauan "to trust", swēran "to honour", þahan "to be silent", witan "to watch, observe".

Possibly also *bnauan "to rub" belongs here—only the present participle occurs, which is not enough to tell whether this is a Class 3 weak verb or Class 7 strong verb.

Notes:

- bauan "to dwell" was originally a Class 7 strong verb (cf. Old Icelandic būa "to dwell", past singular bjō, past participle būenn), and the third singular present indicative is still normally bauiþ, a strong form (vs. *bauáiþ, the expected weak form).
- hatan also occurs as a Class 1 weak verb hatjan.

=== Class 4 ===
Class 4 weak verbs have the suffix -n, in addition to a thematic vowel -ō- in the past tense. In all other tenses, the suffix -n is used before strong verb suffixes.

The following is a sample paradigm of a class 4 weak verb, fullnan "to become full":

Class 4 weak verb conjugation
| Fullnan, "to become full" | | Indicative | | | | | | Optative | | | | | | Imperative | |
| Fullnan, "to become full" | | Active | | | | Passive | | Active | | | | Passive | | Imperative | |
| Fullnan, "to become full" | | Present | | Past | | Present | | Present | | Past | | Present | | Imperative | |
|---|---|---|---|---|---|---|---|---|---|---|---|---|---|---|---|
| Singular | 1st person | fullna | -na | fullnōda | -nōda | fullnada | -nada | fullnáu | -náu | fullnōdēdjáu | -nōdēdjáu | fullnáidáu | -náidáu | | |
| Singular | 2nd person | fullnis | -nis | fullnōdēs | -nōdēs | fullnaza | -naza | fullnáis | -náis | fullnōdēdeis | -nōdēdeis | fullnáizáu | -náizáu | fulln | -n |
| Singular | 3rd person | fullniþ | -niþ | fullnōda | -nōda | fullnada | -nada | fullnái | -nái | fullnōdēdi | -nōdēdi | fullnáidáu | -náidáu | fullnadáu | -nadáu |
| Dual | 1st person | fullnōs | -nōs | fullnōdēdu | -nōdēdu | — | | fullnáiwa | -náiwa | fullnōdēdeiwa | -nōdēdeiwa | — | | — | |
| Dual | 2nd person | fullnats | -nats | fullnōdēduts | -nōdēduts | — | | fullnáits | -náits | fullnōdēdeits | -nōdēdeits | fullnats | -nats | fullnats | -nats |
| Plural | 1st person | fullnam | -nam | fullnōdēdum | -nōdēdum | fullnanda | -nanda | fullnáima | -náima | fullnōdēdeima | -nōdēdeima | fullnáindáu | -náindáu | fullnam | -nam |
| Plural | 2nd person | fullniþ | -niþ | fullnōdēduþ | -nōdēduþ | fullnanda | -nanda | fullnáiþ | -náiþ | fullnōdēdeiþ | -nōdēdeiþ | fullnáindáu | -náindáu | fullniþ | -niþ |
| Plural | 3rd person | fullnand | -nand | fullnōdēdun | -nōdēdun | fullnanda | -nanda | fullnáina | -náina | fullnōdēdeina | -nōdēdeina | fullnáindáu | -náindáu | fullnandáu | -nandáu |
| Infinitive | | fullnan (-nan) | | | | | | | | | | | | | |
| Present Participle | | fullnands (-nands) | | | | | | | | | | | | | |
| Past Participle | | fullnōþs (-nōþs) | | | | | | | | | | | | | |

== Preterite-present verbs ==
So-called "preterite-present verbs" are a feature of Germanic languages that have a present tense formed like the past tense (or "preterite") of strong verbs. The verbs often have the semantics of modal verbs, and in fact the present-day English modal verbs "can, could, may, might, shall, should, must" are descended from Old English preterite-present verbs. The past tense of these verbs is a new formation and has the endings of weak verbs. Arguably, all seven classes of strong verbs are represented in Gothic by at least one preterite-present verb.

The following table presents almost all extant forms of each of the existing preterite-present verbs in Gothic. Many of the missing forms can be derived from existing forms as the number of principal parts is small—in fact, three is usually enough: First/third person singular present indicative, first (or third) person plural present indicative, first/third person singular past indicative. However, occasional small irregularities may occur, and the table below errs on the side of under-generalization. Forms with an *italicized asterisk are reconstructions based on knowledge of other forms or forms from other Germanic languages.

Furthermore, present participles are given a gloss, since the participle often has an unpredictable meaning; especially when the verb in question is inherently intransitive. *ōgan ("to fear") is the only verb in the group known to have an imperative.

Preterite-present verb corpus
| Preterite-present corpus | | | | Infintive | Participle | | Indicative | | Optative | | Imperative |
| Preterite-present corpus | | | | Infintive | Present | Past | Present | Past | Present | Past | Imperative |
| Class | Verb | | | Infintive | Present | Past | Present | Past | Present | Past | Imperative |
|---|---|---|---|---|---|---|---|---|---|---|---|
| 1 | to know | Singular | 1st person | — | | | láis | — | | | |
| 1 | to know | Singular | 3rd person | — | | | láis | — | | | |
| 1 | to know | Singular | 1st person | — | witands | — | wáit | wissa | witjáu | wissēdjáu | |
| 1 | to know | Singular | 2nd person | — | witands | — | wáist | — | | | |
| 1 | to know | Singular | 3rd person | — | witands | — | wáit | wissa | — | | |
| 1 | to know | Plural | 1st person | — | witands | — | witum | — | | | |
| 2 | to be good for | Singular | 1st person | — | | | dáug | — | | | |
| 2 | to be good for | Singular | 3rd person | — | | | dáug | — | | | |
| 3 | to dare | Singular | 1st person | gadaúrsan | — | | gadars | gadaúrsta | — | gadaúrstjáu | |
| 3 | to dare | Singular | 3rd person | gadaúrsan | — | | gadars | gadaúrsta | — | | |
| 3 | to dare | Plural | 1st person | gadaúrsan | — | | gadaúrsum | — | | | |
| 3 | to know | Singular | 1st person | kunnan | kunnands | kunþs | kann | kunþa | — | kunþēdjáu | |
| 3 | to know | Singular | 2nd person | kunnan | kunnands | kunþs | kant | — | | | |
| 3 | to know | Singular | 3rd person | kunnan | kunnands | kunþs | kann | kunþa | | | |
| 3 | to know | Plural | 1st person | kunnan | kunnands | kunþs | kunnum | — | | | |
| 3 | to need | Singular | 1st person | — | þaúrbands | þaúrfts | þarf | þaúrfta | þaúrbjáu | — | |
| 3 | to need | Singular | 2nd person | — | þaúrbands | þaúrfts | þarft | — | | | |
| 3 | to need | Singular | 3rd person | — | þaúrbands | þaúrfts | þarf | þaúrfta | — | | |
| 3 | to need | Plural | 1st person | — | þaúrbands | þaúrfts | þaúrbum | — | | | |
| 4 | to be allowed | Singular | 1st person | — | | binaúhts | binah | — | | | |
| 4 | to be allowed | Singular | 3rd person | — | | binaúhts | binah | — | | | |
| 4 | to suffice | Singular | 1st person | — | | | ganah | — | | | |
| 4 | to suffice | Singular | 3rd person | — | | | ganah | — | | | |
| 4 | to think | Singular | 1st person | munan | munands | munds | man | — | munjáu | — | |
| 4 | to think | Singular | 2nd person | munan | munands | munds | mant | — | | | |
| 4 | to think | Singular | 3rd person | munan | munands | munds | man | — | | | |
| 4 | to think | Plural | 1st person | munan | munands | munds | munum | — | | | |
| 4 | shall; to owe | Singular | 1st person | — | skulands | skulds | skal | skulda | skuljáu | skuldēdjáu | |
| 4 | shall; to owe | Singular | 2nd person | — | skulands | skulds | skalt | — | | | |
| 4 | shall; to owe | Singular | 3rd person | — | skulands | skulds | skal | skulda | | | |
| 4 | shall; to owe | Plural | 1st person | — | skulands | skulds | skulum | — | | | |
| 5 | can; may | Singular | 1st person | — | magands | mahts | mag | mahta | magjáu | mahtēdjáu | |
| 5 | can; may | Singular | 2nd person | — | magands | mahts | magt | — | | | |
| 5 | can; may | Singular | 3rd person | — | magands | mahts | mag | — | | | |
| 5 | can; may | Dual | 1st person | — | magands | mahts | magu | — | | | |
| 5 | can; may | Dual | 2nd person | — | magands | mahts | maguts | — | | | |
| 5 | can; may | Plural | 1st person | — | magands | mahts | magum | — | | | |
| 6 | to find room | Singular | 1st person | — | | | gamōt | gamōsta | gamōtjáu | — | |
| 6 | to find room | Singular | 3rd person | — | | | gamōt | gamōsta | — | | |
| 6 | to fear | Singular | 1st person | — | (un-agands; "fearless") | — | ōg | ōhta | ōgjáu | — | |
| 6 | to fear | Singular | 2nd person | — | (un-agands; "fearless") | — | — | | | | ōgs |
| 6 | to fear | Singular | 3rd person | — | (un-agands; "fearless") | — | ōg | ōhta | | | — |
| 6 | to fear | Plural | 1st person | — | (un-agands; "fearless") | — | — | | | | ōgeiþ |
| 7 | to have | Singular | 1st person | — | áigands | — | áig | áihta | — | | |
| 7 | to have | Singular | 2nd person | — | áigands | — | — | | | áihtēdeis | |
| 7 | to have | Singular | 3rd person | — | áigands | — | áig | áihta | áigi | — | |
| 7 | to have | Plural | 1st person | — | áigands | — | áigum | — | | | |
| 7 | to have | Plural | 2nd person | — | áigands | — | áiguþ | — | | | |
| 7 | to have | Plural | 3rd person | — | áigands | — | áigun | — | | | |

Stem-final -g- in magan, ōgan, and áigan is often changed to -h-, especially before voiceless consonants. Áigan has the derivative faír-áigan ("to partake of").

Presumed verbal stems, given the extant forms:

Preterite-present verb stems
| Preterite present stems | | | Stem | | | Past Participle Meaning (if differing) |
| Preterite present stems | | | Present 1 | Present 2 | Past | Past Participle Meaning (if differing) |
| Class | Infinitive | Meaning | Present 1 | Present 2 | Past | Past Participle Meaning (if differing) |
|---|---|---|---|---|---|---|
| 1 | lisan | to know | láis- | *lis- | *list- | |
| 1 | witan | to know | wáit- | wit- | wiss- | |
| 2 | dugan | to be good for | dáug- | *dug- | *dáuht- | |
| 3 | gadaúrsan | to dare | gadars- | gadaúrs- | gadaúrst- | |
| 3 | kunnan | to know | kann- | kunn- | kunþ- | known |
| 3 | þaúrban | to need | þarb- | þaúrb- | þaúrft- | necessary |
| 4 | binaúhan | to be allowed | binah- | *binaúh- | binaúht- | enough |
| 4 | ganaúhan | to be enough | ganaúh- | *ganaúh- | *ganaúht- | |
| 4 | munan | to think | man- | mun- | mund- | |
| 4 | skulan | to shall, to owe | skal- | skul- | skuld- | owing |
| 5 | magan | to be able to, can; to may | mag- | | maht- | |
| 6 | gamōtan | to find room | gamōt- | | mōst- | |
| 6 | ōgan | to fear | ōg- | | ōht- | ("fearless", un-agands) |
| 7 | áigan | to have | áig- | | áiht- | |

"Present 1" refers to the indicative present singular personal forms, and "Present 2" refers to all other forms in the present; as well as the imperative and infinitive.

Presumed subject suffixes, given the extant forms:

Preterite-present verb suffixes
| Preterite-present suffixes | | Indicative | | Optative | | Imperative |
| Preterite-present suffixes | | Present | Past | Present | Past | Imperative |
|---|---|---|---|---|---|---|
| Singular | 1st person | -_ | -a | -jáu | -ēdjáú | |
| Singular | 2nd person | -t | *-ēs | -eis | -ēdeis | -s |
| Singular | 3rd person | -_ | -a | -i | *-ēdi | — |
| Dual | 1st person | -u | *-ēdu | *-eiwa | *-ēdeiwa | — |
| Dual | 2nd person | -uts | *-ēduts | *-eits | *-ēdeits | — |
| Plural | 1st person | -um | *-ēdum | -eima | *-ēdeima | — |
| Plural | 2nd person | -uþ | *-ēduþ | -eiþ | *-ēdeiþ | -eiþ |
| Plural | 3rd person | -un | *-ēdun | -eina | *-ēdeina | |
| Infinitive | | -an | | | | |
| Present participle | | -ands | | | | |
| Past participle | | -s | | | | |

== Irregular verbs ==
=== Suppletive verbs ===
==== Wisan, "to be" ====
This highly irregular verb derives from two different Proto-Indo-European roots by suppletion; see Indo-European copula for more.

Wisan conjugation
| Wisan, "to be" | | Indicative | | Optative/ Imperative | |
| Wisan, "to be" | | Present | Past | Present | Past |
|---|---|---|---|---|---|
| Singular | 1st person | im | was | sijáu | wēsjáu |
| Singular | 2nd person | is | wast | sijáis | wēseis |
| Singular | 3rd person | ist | was | sijái | wēsi |
| Dual | 1st person | siju | wēsu | *sijáiwa | wēseiwa |
| Dual | 2nd person | *sijuts | wēsuts | *sijáits | wēseits |
| Plural | 1st person | sijum | wēsum | sijáima | wēseima |
| Plural | 2nd person | sijuþ | wēsuþ | sijáiþ | wēseiþ |
| Plural | 3rd person | sind | wēsun | sijáina | wēseina |
| Infinitive | | wisan | | | |
| Present Participle | | wisands | | | |
| Past Participle | | wisans | | | |

==== Briggan, "to bring" ====
Briggan conjugation
| Briggan, "to bring" | | Indicative | | | Optative | | | Imperative |
| Briggan, "to bring" | | Active | | Passive | Active | | Passive | Imperative |
| Briggan, "to bring" | | Present | Past | Passive | Present | Past | Passive | Imperative |
|---|---|---|---|---|---|---|---|---|
| Singular | 1st person | brigga | brāhta | briggada | briggáu | brāhtēdjáu | briggáidáu | |
| Singular | 2nd person | briggis | brāhtēs | briggaza | briggáis | brāhtēdeis | briggáizáu | brigg |
| Singular | 3rd person | briggiþ | brāhta | briggada | briggáis | brāhtēdi | briggáidáu | briggadáu |
| Dual | 1st person | briggōs | brāhtēdu | — | briggáiwa | brāhtēdeiwa | — | — |
| Dual | 2nd person | briggats | brāhtēduts | — | briggáits | brāhtēdeits | briggats | briggats |
| Plural | 1st person | briggam | brāhtēdum | brigganda | briggáima | brāhtēdeima | briggáindáu | briggam |
| Plural | 2nd person | briggiþ | brāhtēduþ | brigganda | briggáiþ | brāhtēdeiþ | briggáindáu | briggiþ |
| Plural | 3rd person | briggand | brāhtēdun | brigganda | briggáina | brāhtēdeina | briggáindáu | briggandáu |
| Infinitive | | briggan | | | | | | |
| Present Participle | | briggands | | | | | | |
| Past Participle | | brāhts | | | | | | |

==== Gaggan, "to go" ====
Gaggan conjugation
| Gaggan, "to go" | | Indicative | | | Optative | | | Imperative |
| Gaggan, "to go" | | Active | | Passive | Active | | Passive | Imperative |
| Gaggan, "to go" | | Present | Past | Passive | Present | Past | Passive | Imperative |
|---|---|---|---|---|---|---|---|---|
| Singular | 1st person | gagga | iddja | gaggada | gaggáu | iddjēdjáu | gaggáidáu | |
| Singular | 2nd person | gaggis | iddjēs | gaggaza | gaggáis | iddjēdeis | gaggáizáu | gagg |
| Singular | 3rd person | gaggiþ | iddja | gaggada | gaggái | iddjēdi | gaggáidáu | gaggadáu |
| Dual | 1st person | gaggōs | iddjēdu | — | gaggáiwa | iddjēdeiwa | — | — |
| Dual | 2nd person | gaggats | iddjēduts | — | gaggáits | iddjēdeits | gaggats | gaggats |
| Plural | 1st person | gaggam | iddjēdum | gagganda | gaggáima | iddjēdeima | gaggáindáu | gaggam |
| Plural | 2nd person | gaggiþ | iddjēduþ | gagganda | gaggáiþ | iddjēdeits | gaggáindáu | gaggiþ |
| Plural | 3rd person | gaggand | iddjēdun | gagganda | gaggáina | iddjēdeina | gaggáindáu | gaggandáu |
| Infinitive | | gaggan | | | | | | |
| Present Participle | | gaggands | | | | | | |
| Past Participle | | gaggiþs | | | | | | |

==== Wiljan, "to want/will" ====
This irregular verb derives from the fossilized optative mood of a Proto-Indo-European verb (not to be confused with the Gothic mood known as optative, which corresponds to the subjunctive mood of PIE and other Germanic languages).

It lacks present indicative and passive forms.

Wiljan conjugation
| Wiljan, "to want, to will" | | Indicative | Optative | |
| Wiljan, "to want, to will" | | Past | Present | Past |
|---|---|---|---|---|
| Singular | 1st person | wilda | wiljáu | wildēdjáu |
| Singular | 2nd person | wildēs | wileis | wildēdeis |
| Singular | 3rd person | wilda | wili | wildēdi |
| Dual | 1st person | wildēdu | wileiwa | wildēdeiwa |
| Dual | 2nd person | wildēduts | wileits | wildēdeits |
| Plural | 1st person | wildēdum | wileima | wildēdeima |
| Plural | 2nd person | wildēduþ | wileiþ | wildēdeiþ |
| Plural | 3rd person | wildēdun | wileina | wildēdeina |
| Infinitive | | wiljan | | |
| Present Participle | | wiljands | | |

=== Irregular strong verbs ===
==== Fraíhnan, "to ask" ====
Fraíhnan conjugation
| Fraíhnan, "to ask" | | Indicative | | | Optative | | | Imperative |
| Fraíhnan, "to ask" | | Active | | Passive | Active | | Passive | Imperative |
| Fraíhnan, "to ask" | | Present | Past | Present | Present | Past | Present | Imperative |
|---|---|---|---|---|---|---|---|---|
| Singular | 1st person | fraíhna | frah | fraíhnada | fraíhnáu | frēhjáu | fraíhnáidáu | |
| Singular | 2nd person | fraíhnis | fraht | fraíhnaza | fraíhnáis | frēheis | fraíhnáizáu | fraíhn |
| Singular | 3rd person | fraíhniþ | frah | fraíhnada | fraíhnái | frēhi | fraíhnáidáu | fraíhnadáu |
| Dual | 1st person | fraíhnōs | frēhu | — | fraíhnáiwa | frēheiwa | — | — |
| Dual | 2nd person | fraíhnats | frēhuts | — | fraíhnáits | frēheits | fraíhnats | fraíhnats |
| Plural | 1st person | fraíhnam | frēhum | fraíhandáu | fraíhnáima | frēheima | fraíhnáindáu | fraíhnam |
| Plural | 2nd person | fraíhniþ | frēhuþ | fraíhandáu | fraíhnáiþ | frēheiþ | fraíhnáindáu | fraíhniþ |
| Plural | 3rd person | fraíhnand | frēhun | fraíhandáu | fraíhnáina | frēheina | fraíhnáindáu | fraíhnandáu |
| Infinitive | | fraíhnan | | | | | | |
| Present Participle | | fraíhnands | | | | | | |
| Past Participle | | fraíhans | | | | | | |

==== Itan, "to eat" ====
Itan conjugation
| Itan, "to eat" | | Indicative | | | Optative | | | Imperative |
| Itan, "to eat" | | Active | | Passive | Active | | Passive | Imperative |
| Itan, "to eat" | | Present | Past | Present | Present | Past | Present | Imperative |
|---|---|---|---|---|---|---|---|---|
| Singular | 1st person | ita | ēt | itada | itáu | ētjáu | itáidáu | |
| Singular | 2nd person | itis | ētt | itaza | itáis | ēteis | itáizáu | it |
| Singular | 3rd person | itiþ | ēt | itada | itái | ēti | itáidau | itadáu |
| Dual | 1st person | itōs | ētu | — | itáiwa | ēteiwa | — | — |
| Dual | 2nd person | itats | ētuts | — | itáits | ēteits | itats | itats |
| Plural | 1st person | itam | ētum | itanda | itáima | ēteima | itáindáu | itam |
| Plural | 2nd person | itiþ | ētuþ | itanda | itáiþ | ēteiþ | itáindáu | itiþ |
| Plural | 3rd person | itand | ētun | itanda | itáina | ēteina | itáindáu | itandáu |
| Infinitive | | itan | | | | | | |
| Present Participle | | itands | | | | | | |
| Past Participle | | itans | | | | | | |

==== Standan, "to stand" ====
Standan conjugation
| Standan, "to stand" | | Indicative | | | Optative | | | Imperative |
| Standan, "to stand" | | Active | | Passive | Active | | Passive | Imperative |
| Standan, "to stand" | | Present | Past | Present | Present | Past | Present | Imperative |
|---|---|---|---|---|---|---|---|---|
| Singular | 1st person | standa | stōþ | standada | standáu | stōdjáu | standáidáu | |
| Singular | 2nd person | standis | stōst | standaza | standáis | stōdeis | standáizáu | stand |
| Singular | 3rd person | standiþ | stōþ | standada | standái | stōdi | standáidáu | standáu |
| Dual | 1st person | standōs | stōdu | — | standáiwa | stōdeiwa | — | — |
| Dual | 2nd person | standats | stōduts | — | standáits | stōdeits | standats | standats |
| Plural | 1st person | standam | stōdum | standanda | standáima | stōdeima | standáindáu | standam |
| Plural | 2nd person | standiþ | stōduþ | standanda | standáiþ | stōdeiþ | standáindáu | standiþ |
| Plural | 3rd person | standand | stōdun | standanda | standáina | stōdeina | standáindáu | standandáu |
| Infinitive | | standan | | | | | | |
| Present Participle | | standands | | | | | | |
| Past Participle | | standans | | | | | | |

=== Irregular weak verbs ===
==== Brūkjan, "to use" ====
Brūkjan conjugation
| Brūkjan, "to use" | | Indicative | | | Optative | | | Imperative |
| Brūkjan, "to use" | | Active | | Passive | Active | | Passive | Imperative |
| Brūkjan, "to use" | | Present | Past | Present | Present | Past | Present | Imperative |
|---|---|---|---|---|---|---|---|---|
| Singular | 1st person | brūkja | brūhta | brūkjada | brūkjáu | brūhtēdjáu | brūkjáidáu | |
| Singular | 2nd person | brūkeis | brūhtēs | brūkjaza | brūkjáis | brūhtēdeis | brūkjáizáu | brūkei |
| Singular | 3rd person | brūkeiþ | brūhta | brūkjada | brūkjái | brūhtēdi | brūkjáidáu | brūkjadáu |
| Dual | 1st person | brūkjōs | brūhtēdu | — | brūkjáiwa | brūhtēdeiwa | — | — |
| Dual | 2nd person | brūkjats | brūhtēduts | — | brūkjáits | brūhtēdeits | brūkjats | brūkjats |
| Plural | 1st person | brūkjam | brūhtēdum | brūkjanda | brūkjáima | brūhtēdeima | brūkjáindáu | brūkjam |
| Plural | 2nd person | brūkeiþ | brūhtēduþ | brūkjanda | brūkjáiþ | brūhtēdeiþ | brūkjáindáu | brūkeiþ |
| Plural | 3rd person | brūkjand | brūhtēdun | brūkjanda | brūkjáina | brūhtēdeina | brūkjáindáu | brūkjandáu |
| Infinitive | | brūkjan | | | | | | |
| Present Participle | | brūkjands | | | | | | |
| Past Participle | | brūhts | | | | | | |

==== Bugjan, "to buy" ====
Bugjan conjugation
| Bugjan, "to buy" | | Indicative | | | Optative | | | Imperative |
| Bugjan, "to buy" | | Active | | Passive | Active | | Passive | Imperative |
| Bugjan, "to buy" | | Present | Past | Present | Present | Past | Present | Imperative |
|---|---|---|---|---|---|---|---|---|
| Singular | 1st person | bugja | baúhta | bugjada | bugjáu | baúhtēdjáu | bugjáizáu | |
| Singular | 2nd person | bugjis | baúhtēs | bugjaza | bugjáis | baúhtēdeis | bugjáizáu | bugei |
| Singular | 3rd person | bugjiþ | baúhta | bugjada | bugjái | baúhtēdi | bugjáidáu | bugjadáu |
| Dual | 1st person | bugjōs | baúhtēdu | — | bugjáiwa | baúhtēdeiwa | — | — |
| Dual | 2nd person | bugjats | baúhtēduts | — | bugjáits | baúhtēdeits | bugjats | bugjats |
| Plural | 1st person | bugjam | baúhtēdum | bugjanda | bugjáima | baúhtēdeima | bugjáindáu | bugjam |
| Plural | 2nd person | bugjiþ | baúhtēduþ | bugjanda | bugjáiþ | baúhtēdeiþ | bugjáindáu | bugjiþ |
| Plural | 3rd person | bugjand | baúhtēdun | bugjanda | bugjáina | baúhtēdeina | bugjáindáu | bugjandáu |
| Infinitive | | bugjan | | | | | | |
| Present Participle | | bugjands | | | | | | |
| Past Participle | | baúhts | | | | | | |

==== Káupatjan, "to slap" ====
Káupatjan conjugation
| Káuptjan, "to slap" | | Indicative | | | Optative | | | Imperative |
| Káuptjan, "to slap" | | Active | | Passive | Active | | Passive | Imperative |
| Káuptjan, "to slap" | | Present | Past | Present | Present | Past | Present | Imperative |
|---|---|---|---|---|---|---|---|---|
| Singular | 1st person | káupatja | káupasta | káupatjada | káupatjáu | káupastēdjáu | káupatjáidáu | |
| Singular | 2nd person | káupatjis | káupastēs | káupatjaza | káupatjáis | káupastēdeis | káupatjáizáu | káupatei |
| Singular | 3rd person | káupatjiþ | káupasta | káupatjada | káupatjái | káupastēdi | káuptjáidáu | káupatjadáu |
| Dual | 1st person | káupatjōs | káupastēdu | — | káupatjáiwa | káupastēdeiwa | — | — |
| Dual | 2nd person | káupatjats | káupastēduts | — | káupatjáits | káupastēdeits | káupatjats | káupatjats |
| Plural | 1st person | káupatjam | káupastēdum | káupatjanda | káupatjáima | káupastēdeima | káupatjáindáu | káupatjam |
| Plural | 2nd person | káupatjiþ | káupastēduþ | káupatjanda | káupatjáiþ | káupastēdeiþ | káupatjáindáu | káupatjiþ |
| Plural | 3rd person | káupatjand | káupastēdun | káupatjanda | káupatjáina | káupastēdeina | káupatjáindáu | káupatjandáu |
| Infinitive | | káupatjan | | | | | | |
| Present Participle | | káupatjands | | | | | | |
| Past Participle | | káupatiþs | | | | | | |

==== Þagkjan, "to think" ====
Þagkjan, "to think"
| Þagkjan, "to think" | | Indicative | | | Optative | | | Imperative |
| Þagkjan, "to think" | | Active | | Passive | Active | | Passive | Imperative |
| Þagkjan, "to think" | | Present | Past | Present | Present | Past | Present | Imperative |
|---|---|---|---|---|---|---|---|---|
| Singular | 1st person | þagkja | þāhta | þagkjada | þagkjáu | þāhtēdjáu | þagkjáidáu | |
| Singular | 2nd person | þagkjis | þāhtēs | þagkjaza | þagkjáis | þāhtēdeis | þagkjáizáu | þagkei |
| Singular | 3rd person | þagkjiþ | þāhta | þagkjada | þagkjái | þāhtēdi | þagkjáidáu | þagkjadáu |
| Dual | 1st person | þagkjōs | þāhtēdu | — | þagkjáiwa | þāhtēdeiwa | — | — |
| Dual | 2nd person | þagkjats | þāhtēduts | — | þagkjáits | þāhtēdeits | þagkjats | þagkjats |
| Plural | 1st person | þagkjam | þāhtēdum | þagkjanda | þagkjáima | þāhtēdeima | þagkjáindáu | þagkjam |
| Plural | 2nd person | þagkjiþ | þāhtēduþ | þagkjanda | þagkjáiþ | þāhtēdeiþ | þagkjáindáu | þagkjiþ |
| Plural | 3rd person | þagkjand | þāhtēdun | þagkjanda | þagkjáina | þāhtēdeina | þagkjáindáu | þagkjandáu |
| Infinitive | | þagkjan | | | | | | |
| Present Participle | | þagkjands | | | | | | |
| Past Participle | | þāhts | | | | | | |

==== Þugkjan, "to seem" ====
Þugkjan conjugation
| Þugkjan, "to seem" | | Indicative | | | Optative | | | Imperative |
| Þugkjan, "to seem" | | Active | | Passive | Active | | Passive | Imperative |
| Þugkjan, "to seem" | | Present | Past | Present | Present | Past | Present | Imperative |
|---|---|---|---|---|---|---|---|---|
| Singular | 1st person | þugkja | þūhta | þugkjada | þugkjáu | þūhtēdjáu | þugkjáidáu | |
| Singular | 2nd person | þugkjis | þūhtēs | þugkjaza | þugkjáis | þūhtēdeis | þugkjáizáu | þugkei |
| Singular | 3rd person | þugkjiþ | þūhta | þugkjada | þugkjái | þūhtēdi | þugkjáidáu | þugkjadáu |
| Dual | 1st person | þugkjōs | þūhtēdu | — | þugkjáiwa | þūhtēdeiwa | — | — |
| Dual | 2nd person | þugkjats | þūhtēduts | — | þugkjáits | þūhtēdeits | þugkjats | þugkjats |
| Plural | 1st person | þugkjam | þūhtēdum | þugkjanda | þugkjáima | þūhtēdeima | þugkjáindáu | þugkjam |
| Plural | 2nd person | þugkjiþ | þūhtēduþ | þugkjanda | þugkjáiþ | þūhtēdeiþ | þugkjáindáu | þugkjiþ |
| Plural | 3rd person | þugkjand | þūhtēdun | þugkjanda | þugkjáiwa | þūhtēdeina | þugkjáindáu | þugkjandáu |
| Infinitive | | þugkjan | | | | | | |
| Present Participle | | þugkjands | | | | | | |
| Past Participle | | þūhts | | | | | | |

==== Waúrkjan, "to work" ====
Waúrkjan conjugation
| Waúrkjan, "to work" | | Indicative | | | Optative | | | Imperative |
| Waúrkjan, "to work" | | Active | | Passive | Active | | Passive | Imperative |
| Waúrkjan, "to work" | | Present | Past | Present | Present | Past | Present | Imperative |
|---|---|---|---|---|---|---|---|---|
| Singular | 1st person | waúrkja | waúrhta | waúrkjada | waúrkjáu | waúrhtēdjáu | waúrkjáidáu | |
| Singular | 2nd person | waúrkjis | waúrhtēs | waúrkjaza | waúrkjáis | waúrhtēdeis | waúrkjáizáu | waúrkei |
| Singular | 3rd person | waúrkjiþ | waúrhta | waúrkjada | waúrkjái | waúrhtēdi | waúrkjáidáu | waúrkjadáu |
| Dual | 1st person | waúrkjōs | waúrhtēdu | — | waúrkjáiwa | waúrtēdeiwa | — | — |
| Dual | 2nd person | waúrkjats | waúrhtēduts | — | waúrkjáits | waúrhtēdeits | waúrkjats | waúrkjats |
| Plural | 1st person | waúrkjam | waúrhtēdum | waúrkjanda | waúrkjáima | waúrhtēdeima | waúkjáindáu | waúrkjam |
| Plural | 2nd person | waúrkjiþ | waúrhtēduþ | waúrkjanda | waúrkjáiþ | waúrhtēdeiþ | waúkjáindáu | waúrkjiþ |
| Plural | 3rd person | waúrkjand | waúrtēdun | waúrkjanda | waúrkjáina | waúrhtēdeina | waúkjáindáu | waúrkjandáu |
| Infinitive | | waúrkjan | | | | | | |
| Present Participle | | waúrkands | | | | | | |
| Past Participle | | waúrhts | | | | | | |

== See also ==
- Gothic language
- Grammar of the Gothic Language
- Proto-Indo-European verb
  - Ancient Greek grammar
  - Latin conjugation
  - Sanskrit verbs

== Works cited ==
- Bennett, William Holmes (1980). An Introduction to the Gothic Language. New York: Modern Language Association of America.
- Braune, Wilhelm; Heidermanns, Frank (2004). Gotische Grammatik (20 ed.). Max Niemeyer. doi:10.1515/9783110945089. ISBN 978-3-484-10850-9.
- Miller, D. Gary (2019). The Oxford Gothic Grammar. Oxford: Oxford University Press. ISBN 978-0198813590.
- Wright, Joseph (1910). Grammar of the Gothic Language. Oxford: Clarendon Press.
