= O with diaeresis =

O with diaeresis may refer to:

- O with diaeresis (Cyrillic) (Ӧ, ӧ), a letter in Cyrillic alphabets such as Kurdish, Udmurt, Altay, Khakass, Mari, Udmurt and Komi
- O with diaeresis (Latin) (Ö, ö), a letter in Latin alphabets such as Estonian, Finnish, Hungarian, Icelandic, Swedish, Romani, Turkish, Azerbaijani and Tajik

== See also ==
- Oe with diaeresis, a letter of the Cyrillic script
