= Omega (Cyrillic) =

Cyrillic letter

- Ѡ ѡ

Usage
- Writing system: Cyrillic
- Type: Alphabetic
- Sound values: /ɔ/

History
- Development: Ω ω: Ѡ ѡ

Other
- Associated numbers: 800 (Cyrillic numerals)

Omega (Ѡ ѡ; italics: Ѡ ѡ) is a letter used in the early Cyrillic alphabet. Its name and capital form are derived directly from the Greek letter Omega ⟨Ω ω⟩.

In some forms it looks similar to the letter We.

The Cyrillic letter broad omega ⟨Ꙍ ꙍ⟩.

Unlike Greek, the Slavic languages had only a single /ɔ/ sound, so Omega was little used compared to the letter O (О о), descended from the Greek letter Omicron. In the older ustav writing, Omega was used mainly for its numeric value of 800, and rarely appeared even in Greek words. In later semi-ustav manuscripts it was used for decorative purposes, along with the broad version ⟨Ꙍ ꙍ⟩ as well as the Broad On ⟨Ѻ ѻ⟩.

Modern Church Slavonic has developed strict rules for the use of these letterforms.

The Cyrillic letter beautiful omega ⟨Ѽ ѽ⟩.

Another variation of omega is the ornate or beautiful omega, used as an interjection, "O!". It is represented in Unicode 5.1 by the misnamed character omega with titlo ⟨Ѽ ѽ⟩. It descends from the Greek omega with the smooth breathing (psili) and circumflex (perispomeni) diacritical marks ⟨Ὦ ὦ⟩, also used in the corresponding exclamation in ancient Greek.

== Computing codes ==
Character information
Preview	Ѡ		ѡ		Ѽ		ѽ		Ꙍ		ꙍ	
Unicode name	CYRILLIC CAPITAL LETTER OMEGA		CYRILLIC SMALL LETTER OMEGA		CYRILLIC CAPITAL LETTER OMEGA WITH TITLO		CYRILLIC SMALL LETTER OMEGA WITH TITLO		CYRILLIC CAPITAL LETTER BROAD OMEGA		CYRILLIC SMALL LETTER BROAD OMEGA	
Encodings	decimal	hex	dec	hex	dec	hex	dec	hex	dec	hex	dec	hex
Unicode	1120	U+0460	1121	U+0461	1148	U+047C	1149	U+047D	42572	U+A64C	42573	U+A64D
UTF-8	209 160	D1 A0	209 161	D1 A1	209 188	D1 BC	209 189	D1 BD	234 153 140	EA 99 8C	234 153 141	EA 99 8D
Numeric character reference	&#1120;	&#x460;	&#1121;	&#x461;	&#1148;	&#x47C;	&#1149;	&#x47D;	&#42572;	&#xA64C;	&#42573;	&#xA64D;

== See also ==
- Cyrillic letter ѿ (ot)
- Latin omega
