= Charles Swainson (disambiguation) =

Charles Swainson was an English theologian.

Charles Swainson may also refer to:

- Charles Swainson of Preston (1780–1866), English textile manufacturer
- Charles Swainson (naturalist) (1840–1913), English cleric known as an ornithologist
