= Manfred Markus =

Austrian professor

Manfred Markus (born 15 February 1941 in Hagen, Germany), is a German-Austrian linguist and university professor. He has been professor emeritus since 2009.

== Education and career ==
After studying philosophy, pedagogy, English, and German at the universities of Heidelberg, Reading, and Göttingen and the "Habilitation" at the University of Regensburg in 1980, Markus was chairholder as a full professor of English linguistics and mediaeval English literature at the University of Innsbruck, Austria, from 1981 to 2009. He was head of the English Department there from 1985 to 1995 and from 2005 to 2007. He was also visiting professor and guest lecturer at several international universities, in particular, at the University of Massachusetts in Amherst, but also in the United Kingdom, Germany, France, Italy, Spain, Denmark, Finland, Japan, Austria, and the Czech Republic. Markus is (co-) author or (co-) editor of 22 scholarly books and some 120 articles. He was also co-editor of the book series Austrian Studies in English (formerly Wiener Beiträge zur Philologie). His edition and translation of the Middle English Arthurian romance Sir Gawain and the Green Knight into German (1974; 4th ed. 2009) has as yet remained the only German edition of this text.

With a background in English and American literary studies, Markus after 1975 focused on linguistics, both synchronic and diachronic. He is widely known as the director of ICAMET (the Innsbruck Computer Archive of Machine-Readable English Texts), with the two historical text corpora Innsbruck English Letters 1386-1698 and Innsbruck Middle English Prose on his record as compiler. His main achievement as a corpus linguist, however, is the creation of an online version of Joseph Wright's comprehensive English Dialect Dictionary (1898-1905), EDD Online, which, by its software, allows for an access to English dialects worldwide from 1700 to 1903. Markus continued to be director of the EDD Online project, initiated by him in 2005, until its completion in 2022. With his book Literaturlinguistik (2025), he explores the cooperation of linguistics and literary studies.

In 2006, a Festschrift was dedicated to Manfred Markus.

== Personal life ==
Markus has been living in Innsbruck since 1981. He has both the Austrian and the German citizenship. With his wife Ingrid he has two sons, Dirk Markus (born 1971), who is co-founder of the investment company Aurelius Group, and Ron Markus (born 1974), who is a writer and producer for German TV-series

== Main fields of research ==
English dialectology, historical English, phonology, contrastive and corpus linguistics, English varieties, Middle English literature, narrative technique and stylistics, corpus linguistics

== Publications ==
=== Books ===
Markus, Manfred. 2021. English Dialect Dictionary Online: A New Departure in English Dialectology. Cambridge: Cambridge University Press.

Markus, Manfred. 1990. Mittelenglisches Studienbuch. UTB Große Reihe. Tübingen: Francke.

Markus, Manfred. 1985. Point of View im Erzähltext: Eine angewandte Typologie am Beispiel der frühen amerikanischen Short Story, insbesondere Poes und Hawthornes. Sonderheft 60. Innsbruck: Innsbrucker Beiträge zur Kulturwissenschaft.

Markus, Manfred. 1977. Tempus und Aspekt. Zur Funktion von Präsens, Präteritum und Perfekt im Englischen und Deutschen. Kritische Information, 61. München: Fink.

Markus, Manfred, ed. and transl. 1974. Sir Gawain and the Green Knight. Sir Gawain und der Grüne Ritter. Stuttgart: Reclam (4th ed. 2009. Stuttgart: Reclam).

Markus, Manfred. 1971. Moderne Erzählperspektive in den Werken des Gawain-Autors. Nürnberg, Regensburg: Carl Verlag (Neuauflage 1987. Frankfurt/M., Bern, New York: Lang).

=== Edited volumes ===
Markus, Manfred, Yoko Iyeiri, Reinhard Heuberger and Emil Chamson, eds. 2012. Middle and Modern English Corpus Linguistics: A Multi-dimensional Approach. Studies in Corpus Linguistics 50. Amsterdam: John Benjamins.

Markus, Manfred, Clive Upton and Reinhard Heuberger, eds. 2010. Joseph Wright's English Dialect Dictionary and Beyond: Studies in Late Modern English Dialectology. Frankfurt am Main et al.: Peter Lang.

Manfred Markus, with Christian Mair, eds. 1992. New Departures in Contrastive Linguistics: Proceedings of the Conference Held at the Leopold-Franzens-University of Innsbruck, Austria, 10–12 May 1991. 2 vols. Anglistische Reih 5/6. Innsbruck: Innsbrucker Beiträge zur Kulturwissenschaft.

=== Selected articles ===
Markus, Manfred. 2022. "Wright about Wight: a dialect glossary of the Isle of Wight based on EDD Online." Journal of Linguistic Geography 10.2: 76–86. Wright about Wight: A dialect glossary of the Isle of Wight based on EDD Online.

Markus, Manfred. 2021. "OED and EDD: comparison of the printed and online versions." Lexicographica 37: 261–280.

Markus, Manfred. 2021. "Aphesis and aphaeresis in Late Modern English dialects (based on EDD Online)." English Studies 102.1: 124–141.

Markus, Manfred. 2020. "What did Joseph Wright mean by meaning: The complexity of lexical semantics in the English Dialect Dictionary Online." International Journal of English Studies 20.1: 1-25.

Markus, Manfred. 2017. "The Survival of Shakespeare’s Language in English Dialects (on the Basis of EDD Online)." English Studies 98.8 (2017): 881- 896. Also published online 8 September 2017: The Survival of Shakespeare’s Language in English Dialects (on the Basis of EDD Online)

Markus, Manfred. 2015. "’Sirrah, What's Thy Name?’: The Genesis of Shakespeare's Sirrah in Relation to Sir and Sire in Late Middle and Early Modern English." English Studies 96.2: 1–13.
