= Hugh Bruce Williams =

British Army officer (1865–1942)

Major-General Sir Hugh Bruce Williams KCB DSO
- Born: July 24, 1865; Shimla, Punjab, British Raj (today Himachal Pradesh, India)
- Died: December 14, 1942 (aged 77); Chillies Lane, High Hurstwood, East Sussex, England
- Military career
- Allegiance: United Kingdom
- Branch: British Army
- Service years: 1885–1923
- Rank: Major-General
- Unit: Royal Engineers
- Commands: 37th Division (1916–19); 137th (Staffordshire) Infantry Brigade (1916)
- Conflicts: Second Boer War; First World War
- Awards: Knight Commander of the Order of the Bath; Distinguished Service Order; Mentioned in dispatches

Major-General Sir Hugh Bruce Williams, KCB, DSO (24 July 1865 – 14 December 1942) was a British Army officer.

== Early military career ==
Hugh Bruce Williams was born in 24 July 1865, the son of General Sir Edward Charles Sparshott Williams of the British Army. He was educated at Winchester College, followed by the Royal Military Academy, Woolwich, where, "after a brilliant career at ‘The Shop’, where he passed out head of his batch and won the Pollock Medal". and was commissioned as a lieutenant into the Royal Engineers of the British Army in April 1885.

Williams, promoted in March 1894 to captain, attended the Staff College, Camberley, which "confirmed his profile as a ‘serious’ officer", in 1899.

He later served in the Second Boer War, which began in October 1899, and "provided further opportunity for professional distinction". He "specialised in intelligence work", and served as a deputy assistant adjutant general (DAAG), which brought him into contact with Colonel Walter Kitchener and Brigadier General Herbert Plumer, both of whom thought highly of him. Williams, promoted to the brevet rank of major in April 1901, "achieved a great reputation for organising night attacks" during the war, and was awarded the Distinguished Service Order (DSO) "in recognition of his Intelligence Work with Brigadier-General Plumer".

He became a deputy assistant quartermaster general (DAQMG) at the War Office in London in April 1904 which brought him into contact with William Robertson, who like Plumer later became a field marshal. He succeeded Major Walter Braithwaite as a DAAG in January 1906. In October 1907 he became brigade major and secretary at the School of Military Engineering (later the Royal School of Military Engineering) at Chatham, Kent. Having succeeded Colonel Aylmer Hunter-Weston as general staff officer, grade 2 (GSO2), of Eastern Command in June 1908, he was promoted to lieutenant colonel in July.

After serving as a GSO2 again, he was placed on the half-pay list from October 1911 until January 1912, when he was again appointed as a GSO2.

== First World War ==
He was promoted to the temporary rank of brigadier general in December 1914, some four months after the First World War broke out. He was made a Companion of the Order of the Bath in February 1915. After being promoted once again, now to temporary major general and succeeding Major General G. F. Milne as major general, general staff, of General Sir Herbert Plumer's Second Army on the Western Front, Williams accepted a demotion and went on to succeed Brigadier General Edward Feetham in command of the 137th (Staffordshire) Infantry Brigade, part of the 46th (North Midland) Division of the Territorial Force (TF). He led the brigade in the disastrous attack on the Gommecourt Salient on 1 July 1916, which was "a complete failure".

Later that year he took command of the 37th Division, a Kitchener's Army formation which, under him, "became a first-class formation, an achievement that was considerably assisted by his GSO1, Lieutenant-Colonel John Dill", who later became a field marshal in the next world war. Williams remained in command of the 37th Division for the remainder of the war, leading them through major engagements at Arras, Passchendaele in 1917, and the final Hundred Days Offensive in 1918.

He was promoted to substantive major general in June 1917 "for distinguished service in the Field".

== Post-war years ==
Williams, made a KCB in June 1919, retired from the army as a substantive major general in January 1923.
