= Elizabeth Mary Wright =

English linguist and folklorist

- Elizabeth Mary Wright, 1923
- Born: Elizabeth Mary Lea; 10 October 1863; London, England
- Died: 4 October 1958 (aged 94); Oxford, England
- Occupations: Linguist; Folklorist; Writer
- Spouse: Joseph Wright (m. 1896; died 1930)

Academic background
- Education: Lady Margaret Hall, Oxford

Academic work
- Discipline: English Language
- Sub-discipline: Dialects

Elizabeth Mary Wright (10 October 1863 – 4 October 1958) was an English linguist and folklorist.

== Biography ==
Elizabeth Mary Lea was born in the East End of London on 10 October 1863. She was the eldest daughter of Elizabeth Catherine (born Clark) and William Simcox Lea, who was an Anglican clergyman. He was the perpetual curate of the Holy Trinity church in Mile End. She had four younger sisters and two younger brothers. After a year in Somerset, the family moved in 1873 to Tedstone Delamere in Herefordshire. After a period at boarding school Elizabeth lived at home "a very easy and pleasant life, though uneventful and rather useless", until Sophie Weisse, the older sister of her brother's schoolfriend, encouraged her to "aim at more profitable employment of my time and such talents as I possessed." At her father's suggestion she applied to Lady Margaret Hall, Oxford, where she was accepted, matriculating in October 1887.

She first encountered Joseph Wright in her second year at Lady Margaret Hall, when she attended his Old English lectures. During her third year, he enquired about her willingness "to do eventually some original work" and she subsequently worked under him to prepare a grammar of the dialect of Northumbria. Elizabeth and Joseph married in 1896. Together the Wrights compiled The English Dialect Dictionary in six volumes between 1898 and 1905. Elizabeth undertook most of the secretarial work for the dictionary which included numerous letters and "50,000 prospectuses".

On 2 July 1934 Wright was awarded an honorary degree of Doctor of Letters from the University of Leeds.

After Joseph's death in 1930, Elizabeth published a two-volume biography of him. In Joseph Wright's Dictionary of National Biography entry they are recorded as being described by contemporaries as "the happiest couple in Oxford". They had two children who died in childhood. She died in 1958 and was buried in Wolvercote Cemetery.

== Publications ==
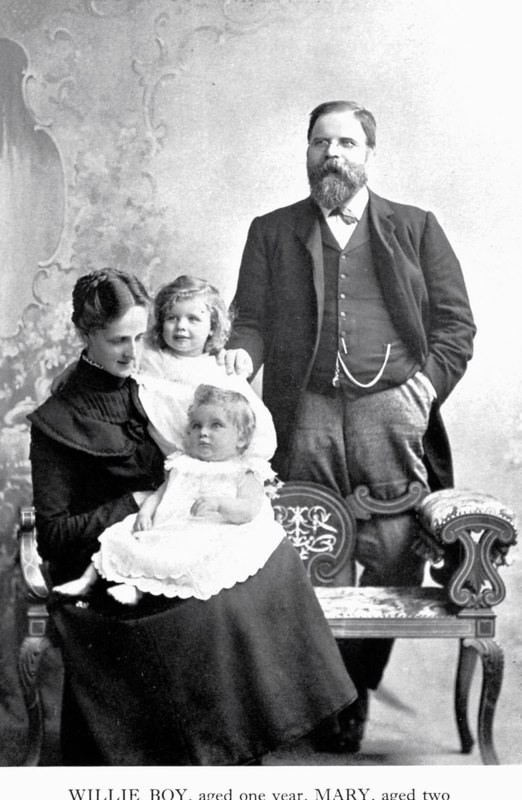
Joseph and Elizabeth Wright with their children, c. 1907

=== Books ===
- Wright, Elizabeth Mary (1913). Rustic Speech and Folk-lore. London: Oxford University Press.
- ———— (1932). The Life of Joseph Wright. London: Oxford University Press. (Vol. 1 and Vol. 2.)

with Joseph Wright

- Wright, Joseph; Wright, Elizabeth Mary (1908). Old English Grammar. London: Oxford University Press.
- ————; ———— (1923). Elementary Old English Grammar. London: Oxford University Press. (Abridgement of preceding work.)
- ————; ———— (1923). Elementary Middle English Grammar. London: Oxford University Press.
- ————; ———— (1924). An Elementary Historical New English Grammar. London: Oxford University Press.

=== Articles ===
- Lea, Elizabeth Mary (1894). "The Language of the Northumbrian Gloss to the Gospel of St Mark". Anglia. 16 (Jahresband): 62–134. doi:10.1515/angl.1894.1894.16.62. S2CID 161334171.
- ———— (1894). "The Language of the Northumbrian Gloss to the Gospel of St Mark". Anglia. 16 (Jahresband): 135–514. doi:10.1515/angl.1894.1894.16.135.
- Wright, Elizabeth M. (1902). "Beowulf l. 1363". Englische Studien. 30: 341–343. hdl:2027/uc1.b3385497.
- ———— (1906). "Notes on 'Sir Gawayne and the Green Knight'". Englische Studien. 36: 209–2273. hdl:2027/uc1.b3385503.
- ———— (1907). "The Varieties of English Speech". Quarterly Review. 207: 86–109.
- ———— (April 1935). "Sir Gawain and the Green Knight". Journal of English and Germanic Philology. 34 (2): 157–159. JSTOR 27704011.
- ———— (July 1935). "Sir Gawain and the Green Knight (concluded)". Journal of English and Germanic Philology. 34 (3): 339–350. JSTOR 27704043.
- ———— (July 1936). "Sir Gawain and the Green Knight". Journal of English and Germanic Philology. 35 (3): 313–320. JSTOR 27704152.
- ———— (July 1940). "Additional Notes on "The Pearl"". Journal of English and Germanic Philology. 39 (3): 315–318. JSTOR 27704638.
