= Voiceless labial–velar fricative =

Consonantal sound

Voiceless labialized velar fricative

xʷ

ʍ
- IPA number: 169

Audio sample
- source · help

Encoding
- Entity (decimal): &#653;
- Unicode (hex): U+028D
- X-SAMPA: W
- Braille: ⠖ (braille pattern dots-235) ⠺ (braille pattern dots-2456)
Image

Voiceless labial–velar approximant

w̥

ʍ

A voiceless labial–velar fricative, or more accurately a voiceless labialized velar fricative and sometimes analyzed as a voiceless labial–velar approximant, is a type of consonantal sound, used in spoken languages. The symbol in the International Phonetic Alphabet that represents this sound is ⟨xʷ⟩ or, rather ambiguously, ⟨ʍ⟩. The letter ⟨ʍ⟩ was defined as a "voiceless [w]" until 1979, when it was defined as a fricative with the place of articulation of [k͡p] the same way that [w] is an approximant with the place of articulation of [ɡ͡b]. The IPA Handbook describes ⟨ʍ⟩ as a "fricative" in the introduction, while a chapter within characterizes it as an "approximant".

There has historically been some controversy over whether a voiceless approximant could be distinct from a fricative, but more recent research distinguishes between turbulent (fricative-like) and laminar (vowel- or approximant-like) airflow in the vocal tract. English /ʍ/ is an approximant [w̥], a labialized glottal fricative [hʷ], or a [hw] sequence, not a velar fricative. Scots /ʍ/ has been described as a velar fricative, especially in older Scots and peripheral dialects, where it is [xw]. Ladefoged and Maddieson were unable to confirm that any language has fricatives produced at two places of articulation, as the term "labial–velar" implies. They conclude that "if [ʍ] is a fricative, it is better described as a voiceless labialized velar fricative".

== Features ==
Features of a voiceless labialized velar fricative:

- Its manner of articulation is fricative, which means it is produced by constricting air flow through a narrow channel at the place of articulation, causing turbulence.
- Its place of articulation is labialized velar, which means it is articulated with the back part of the tongue raised toward the soft palate (the velum) while rounding the lips.
- Its phonation is voiceless, which means it is produced without vibrations of the vocal cords.
- It is an oral consonant, which means that air is not allowed to escape through the nose.
- It is a median consonant, which means it is produced by directing the airstream down the midline of the tongue, rather than to the sides.
- Its airstream mechanism is pulmonic, which means it is articulated by pushing air only with the intercostal muscles and abdominal muscles, as in most speech sounds.

== Occurrence ==
=== Voiceless labial–velar fricative ===
Language		Word	IPA	Meaning	Notes
Hupa		xwe꞉y	[xʷeːj]	'his property'	A voiceless labialized velar fricative.
Kabardian		тхуы	[txʷə]	'five'	Corresponds to [f] in Adyghe.
Kurdish	Kurmanji (Northern)	خویشک / xwîşk	[xʷɪʃk]	'sister'	
Kurdish	Kalhori (Southern)	خوەش / xweş	[xʷæʃ]	'nice'	
Lushootseed		dxʷʔiyb	[dxʷʔib]	'Newhalem, Washington'	
Nuxalk		cwtʼ	[xʷtʼ]	'to fall in, collapse'	
Persian	Classical Persian	خواستن / xwâstän	[xʷɑːs.ˈtan]	'to want'	In modern standard dialects of Persian, the pronunciation has evolved to a simple Voiceless velar fricative ([x]) sound.
Shuswap		secwepemctsín	[ʃəxʷəpəməxˈtʃin]	'Shuswap language'	
Spanish		juego	[ˈxʷe.ɣ̞o̞]	'game'	In rapid speech. More commonly [xw]. See Spanish phonology
Washo		Wáʔi	[ˈxʷaʔi] or [ˈw̥aʔi]	'he's the one who's doing it'	Variously described as a labialized velar fricative or a voiceless approximant.

=== Voiceless labial–velar approximant ===
Language		Word	IPA	Meaning	Notes
Aleut	Atkan	hwax̂	[w̥aχ]	'smoke'	
Aleut	Bering	ʼЎaӽ	[w̥aχ]	'smoke'	
English	Received Pronunciation in some Irish and Scottish speakers	whine	[w̥aɪ̯n]	'whine'	English /ʍ/ is generally a labialized velar approximant. It is usually represented phonemically as /hw/, but phonetically it is not a sequence of [h] plus [w] (see English phonology). In General American and New Zealand English only some speakers maintain a distinction with /w/; in Europe, mostly heard in Irish and Scottish accents. See English phonology and pronunciation of English ⟨wh⟩.
English	Cultivated South African	whine	[w̥aɪ̯n]	'whine'	English /ʍ/ is generally a labialized velar approximant. It is usually represented phonemically as /hw/, but phonetically it is not a sequence of [h] plus [w] (see English phonology). In General American and New Zealand English only some speakers maintain a distinction with /w/; in Europe, mostly heard in Irish and Scottish accents. See English phonology and pronunciation of English ⟨wh⟩.
English	Conservative General American	whine	[w̥aɪ̯n]	'whine'	English /ʍ/ is generally a labialized velar approximant. It is usually represented phonemically as /hw/, but phonetically it is not a sequence of [h] plus [w] (see English phonology). In General American and New Zealand English only some speakers maintain a distinction with /w/; in Europe, mostly heard in Irish and Scottish accents. See English phonology and pronunciation of English ⟨wh⟩.
English	Irish	whine	[w̥ʌɪ̯n]	'whine'	English /ʍ/ is generally a labialized velar approximant. It is usually represented phonemically as /hw/, but phonetically it is not a sequence of [h] plus [w] (see English phonology). In General American and New Zealand English only some speakers maintain a distinction with /w/; in Europe, mostly heard in Irish and Scottish accents. See English phonology and pronunciation of English ⟨wh⟩.
English	Scottish	whine	[w̥ʌɪ̯n]	'whine'	English /ʍ/ is generally a labialized velar approximant. It is usually represented phonemically as /hw/, but phonetically it is not a sequence of [h] plus [w] (see English phonology). In General American and New Zealand English only some speakers maintain a distinction with /w/; in Europe, mostly heard in Irish and Scottish accents. See English phonology and pronunciation of English ⟨wh⟩.
English	Southern American	whine	[w̥äːn]	'whine'	English /ʍ/ is generally a labialized velar approximant. It is usually represented phonemically as /hw/, but phonetically it is not a sequence of [h] plus [w] (see English phonology). In General American and New Zealand English only some speakers maintain a distinction with /w/; in Europe, mostly heard in Irish and Scottish accents. See English phonology and pronunciation of English ⟨wh⟩.
English	New Zealand	whine	[w̥ɑe̯n]	'whine'	English /ʍ/ is generally a labialized velar approximant. It is usually represented phonemically as /hw/, but phonetically it is not a sequence of [h] plus [w] (see English phonology). In General American and New Zealand English only some speakers maintain a distinction with /w/; in Europe, mostly heard in Irish and Scottish accents. See English phonology and pronunciation of English ⟨wh⟩.
Kham	Gamale Kham	ह्वा	[w̥ɐ]	'tooth'	Described as an approximant.
Slovene		vse	[ˈw̥sɛ]	'everything'	Allophone of /ʋ/ in the syllable onset before voiceless consonants, in free variation with a vowel [u]. Voiced [w] before voiced consonants. See Slovene phonology.
Washo		Wáʔi	[ˈxʷaʔi] or [ˈw̥aʔi]	'he's the one who's doing it'	Variously described as a labialized velar fricative or a voiceless approximant.

== See also ==
- Index of phonetics articles
- Hwair
- Wh (digraph)
- Wine–whine merger

== Notes ==
Place →	Labial					Coronal										Dorsal					Laryngeal			
Manner ↓	Bilabial		Labiodental		Linguolabial		Dental		Alveolar		Postalveolar		Retroflex		(Alveolo-)palatal		Velar		Uvular		Pharyngeal/epiglottal		Glottal	
Nasal	m̥	m	ɱ̊	ɱ		n̼	n̪̊	n̪	n̥	n	n̠̊	n̠	ɳ̊	ɳ	ɲ̊	ɲ	ŋ̊	ŋ	ɴ̥	ɴ				
Plosive	p	b	p̪	b̪	t̼	d̼	t̪	d̪	t	d			ʈ	ɖ	c	ɟ	k	ɡ	q	ɢ	ʡ		ʔ	
Sibilant affricate							t̪s̪	d̪z̪	ts	dz	t̠ʃ	d̠ʒ	tʂ	dʐ	tɕ	dʑ								
Non-sibilant affricate	pɸ	bβ	p̪f	b̪v			t̪θ	d̪ð	tɹ̝̊	dɹ̝	t̠ɹ̠̊˔	d̠ɹ̠˔			cç	ɟʝ	kx	ɡɣ	qχ	ɢʁ	ʡʜ	ʡʢ	ʔh	
Sibilant fricative							s̪	z̪	s	z	ʃ	ʒ	ʂ	ʐ	ɕ	ʑ								
Non-sibilant fricative	ɸ	β	f	v	θ̼	ð̼	θ	ð	θ̠	ð̠	ɹ̠̊˔	ɹ̠˔	ɻ̊˔	ɻ˔	ç	ʝ	x	ɣ	χ	ʁ	ħ	ʕ	h	ɦ
Approximant		β̞		ʋ				ð̞		ɹ		ɹ̠		ɻ		j		ɰ						˷
Tap/flap		ⱱ̟		ⱱ					ɾ̥	ɾ			ɽ̊	ɽ						ɢ̆		ʡ̆		
Trill	ʙ̥	ʙ							r̥	r		r̠	ɽ̊r̥	ɽr					ʀ̥	ʀ	ʜ	ʢ		
Lateral affricate									tɬ	dɮ			tꞎ	d𝼅	c𝼆	ɟʎ̝	k𝼄	ɡʟ̝						
Lateral fricative							ɬ̪		ɬ	ɮ			ꞎ	𝼅	𝼆	ʎ̝	𝼄	ʟ̝						
Lateral approximant								l̪	l̥	l		l̠	ɭ̊	ɭ	ʎ̥	ʎ	ʟ̥	ʟ		ʟ̠				
Lateral tap/flap									ɺ̥	ɺ			𝼈̊	𝼈		ʎ̆		ʟ̆						

		BL	LD	D	A	PA	RF	P	V	U
Implosive	Voiced	ɓ			ɗ		ᶑ	ʄ	ɠ	ʛ
Implosive	Voiceless	ɓ̥			ɗ̥		ᶑ̊	ʄ̊	ɠ̊	ʛ̥
Ejective	Stop	pʼ			tʼ		ʈʼ	cʼ	kʼ	qʼ
Ejective	Affricate		p̪fʼ	tθʼ	tsʼ	tʃʼ	tʂʼ	tɕʼ	kxʼ	qχʼ
Ejective	Fricative	ɸʼ	fʼ	θʼ	sʼ	ʃʼ	ʂʼ	ɕʼ	xʼ	χʼ
Ejective	Lateral affricate				tɬʼ			c𝼆ʼ	k𝼄ʼ	q𝼄ʼ
Ejective	Lateral fricative				ɬʼ					
Click (top: velar; bottom: uvular)	Tenuis	kʘ qʘ		kǀ qǀ	kǃ qǃ		k𝼊 q𝼊	kǂ qǂ		
Click (top: velar; bottom: uvular)	Voiced	ɡʘ ɢʘ		ɡǀ ɢǀ	ɡǃ ɢǃ		ɡ𝼊 ɢ𝼊	ɡǂ ɢǂ		
Click (top: velar; bottom: uvular)	Nasal	ŋʘ ɴʘ		ŋǀ ɴǀ	ŋǃ ɴǃ		ŋ𝼊 ɴ𝼊	ŋǂ ɴǂ	ʞ	
Click (top: velar; bottom: uvular)	Tenuis lateral				kǁ qǁ					
Click (top: velar; bottom: uvular)	Voiced lateral				ɡǁ ɢǁ					
Click (top: velar; bottom: uvular)	Nasal lateral				ŋǁ ɴǁ					
