= The English Dialect Dictionary =

The English Dialect Dictionary (EDD) is the most comprehensive dictionary of English dialects ever published, compiled by the Yorkshire dialectologist Joseph Wright (1855–1930), with strong support by a team and his wife Elizabeth Mary Wright (1863–1958). The time of dialect use covered is, by and large, the Late Modern English period (1700–1903), but given Wright's historical interest, many entries contain information on etymological precursors of dialect words in centuries as far back as Old English and Middle English. Wright had hundreds of informants ("correspondents") and borrowed from thousands of written sources, mainly glossaries published by the English Dialect Society in the later 19th century, but also many literary texts written in dialect. In contrast to most of his sources, Wright pursued a scholarly linguistic method, providing full evidence of his sources and antedating modes of grammatical analysis of the 20th century. The contents of the EDD's nearly 80,000 entries (including the Supplement) were generally ignored during the 20th century but were made accessible by the interface of EDD Online, the achievement of an Innsbruck University research project first published in 2012 and repeatedly revised since (version 4.0 in March 2023).

== Joseph Wright ==
Compulsory school education was not introduced in Great Britain until as late as 1870, so for Joseph Wright, born into a poor family in 1850, no school was available until he was 14 or 15. In his childhood, he had to work as a donkey-boy in a quarry and as a factory worker in a Bradford weaving mill. Yet he taught himself to read and write all by himself, started self-education on a large scale, attended night-schools, and soon had a good command of Latin, German and other languages and stages of languages, including Gothic and Middle English. After staying at German universities (Heidelberg, Leipzig) for over six years, he worked his way up in various teaching jobs, as a Deputy Professor and as secretary of the English Dialect Society, finally to be elected to a full Professorship of Comparative Philology at the University of Oxford. This was in 1900, when he was just publishing the different parts of his English Dialect Dictionary.

The details of Wright's boyhood and of the romance of his remarkable career ("from donkey-boy to professor"), as well as the difficulties he encountered in publishing the English Dialect Dictionary, were presented in a biography written after his death in 1930 by his widow Elizabeth Mary Wright.

== History of publication ==
During the years immediately preceding the appearance of the first part of the dictionary (1898), Joseph Wright was widely regarded with scepticism concerning both the academic value of the project and its financial coverage. While vast dialect material was made available by the English Dialect Society, no publisher including Oxford University Press would take the pecuniary responsibility for a dictionary of the pre-conceived size. No well-established professor would be burdened by the foreseeably immense amount of drudgery work involved in such a project. However, Professor Walter William Skeat, founder and president of the English Dialect Society, had created a fund in 1886 (of which nearly half was his own money) for the initial collecting and arranging of the material for the dictionary. Arthur Balfour, at the time First Lord of the Treasury, made a grant from the Royal Bounty Fund which helped to complete the work.

After years of nerve-racking hesitation and consultation, Wright finally decided for himself as editor to publish the dictionary by subscription at his own risk. This intention required an enormous amount of activity to promote the planned dictionary and gaining distinguished persons and scholars as subscribers. While he found further sponsors, e.g. Clarendon Press, which provided him rooms for a "workshop", he was compelled partially to finance the project himself.

Henry Frowde, publisher to the University of Oxford and no longer employee of Oxford University Press at the time, served as publisher. The six volumes appeared one at a time over eight years from 1898 to 1905, announced as "being the complete vocabulary of all dialect words still in use, or known to have been in use during the last two hundred years and founded on the publications of the English Dialect Society and on a large amount of material never before printed".

The content was issued progressively as 28 parts intended for binding into the six volumes with publication dates of 1898, 1900, 1902, 1903, 1904 and 1905. Vol. 6 includes the list of both printed and unprinted sources arranged by counties.

== Structure ==
The EDD comprises almost 80,000 entries of dialect words, about 10,000 of which were added in the Supplement. The entries are of different length, ranging from cross-references to analyses of dialectal forms and meanings expanding over several pages. The true value of the Dictionary lies in the wealth of information contained within the entries. The data provided refers to usage labels of the headwords, pronunciation, spelling and phonetic variants, definitions, quotations from thousands of sources, types of word formation (such as compounds and phraseologisms), as well as the areas of usage within the UK and worldwide. Moreover, the Dictionary is very scrupulous in adding information on historical precursors of dialect words, including both etymology and morphology.

An impression of the form and size of the Dictionary is given by the following online versions of the six volumes:

- Vol. 1: A-C
- Vol. 2: D-G
- Vol. 3: H-L
- Vol. 4: M-Q
- Vol. 5: R-S
- Vol. 6: T-Z, with corrigenda, supplement, bibliography and grammar

Due to the scale of the work and the period in which the information was gathered, the Dictionary is a standard work in the historical study of dialect. Wright marked annotations and corrections in a cut-up and rebound copy of the first edition; this copy is among Wright's papers in the Bodleian Library at the University of Oxford.

== English Dialect Grammar ==
The sixth volume includes the English Dialect Grammar, which was also published separately. This includes 16,000 dialectal forms across two main sections: 'Phonology', which gives a historical description of the development of sounds in dialect; and 'Accidence', which gave details on grammar and especially on morphology.

Unlike Alexander John Ellis's monumental work on Early English Pronunciation, Volume V, Wright's Grammar is very condensed. Its descriptive part comprises merely 82 pages, followed, however, by more than a hundred pages of an index, which relates words to dialect areas. The six chapters of the Grammar proper are: I. Phonetic Alphabet; II. The Vowels of Accented Syllables; III. The French Element; IV. Vowels of Unaccented Syllables; V. The Consonants; and VI. Accidence. In his Introduction Wright explicitly mentions that in the classification of the dialects he has "in a great measure followed the one given by Dr. Ellis". As regards phonetic details, Wright also borrowed material from Ellis, for which he has been criticized by some linguists. Peter Anderson claimed that Wright did Ellis a "disservice" by criticising Ellis's methods used in collecting data, but then using almost identical methods in English Dialect Grammar and taking on much of Ellis's data for his own work. Both Peter Anderson and Graham Shorrocks have argued that Wright distorted Ellis's data by using a less precise phonetic notation and using vague geographical areas rather than the precise locations given by Ellis.

Overall, the Grammar, while obliged to many previous scholars, in the wake of the creation of the EDD, introduced much new material G.L. Brook referred to the Grammar as "a less satisfactory work than the English Dialect Dictionary".

== EDD Online (Innsbruck Project) ==
The English Dialect Dictionary Online (EDD Online), a database and software initiated by Manfred Markus at the University of Innsbruck, provides a computerised version of Wright's English Dialect Dictionary. Work on the project has been ongoing since 2006. The third version is presently (summer 2023) available. The fourth version was released in March 2023: EDD Online 4.0.

While various scanned copies of the work from libraries are currently available through the Internet Archive, these disallow queries beyond the alphabetically arranged entry-headwords and beyond full-text searches, and Wright's corrigenda and the 170-page Supplement, given their non-integrated position in the six-volume work, are bound to be overlooked. With the help of the Innsbruck interface, users can focus on different linguistic aspects of the Dictionary's text beyond the mere headwords, in order to retrieve formally or semantically specific information based on the whole EDD. Similar to the online version of the OED (OED 3), EDD Online allows for a large number of parameters (e.g. compounds or variants) and filters (e.g. of areas and time). The details of the enormous potential of EDD Online and the repercussions for a new concept of English dialectology are described in a monograph by Manfred Markus published in 2021.

== See also ==
- Dictionary of American Regional English
