= Cyrillic O variants =

Alternative forms for the Cyrillic letter O

This is a list of rare glyph variants of the Cyrillic letter O. They were proposed for inclusion into Unicode in 2007 and incorporated as in Unicode 5.1.

== Monocular O ==
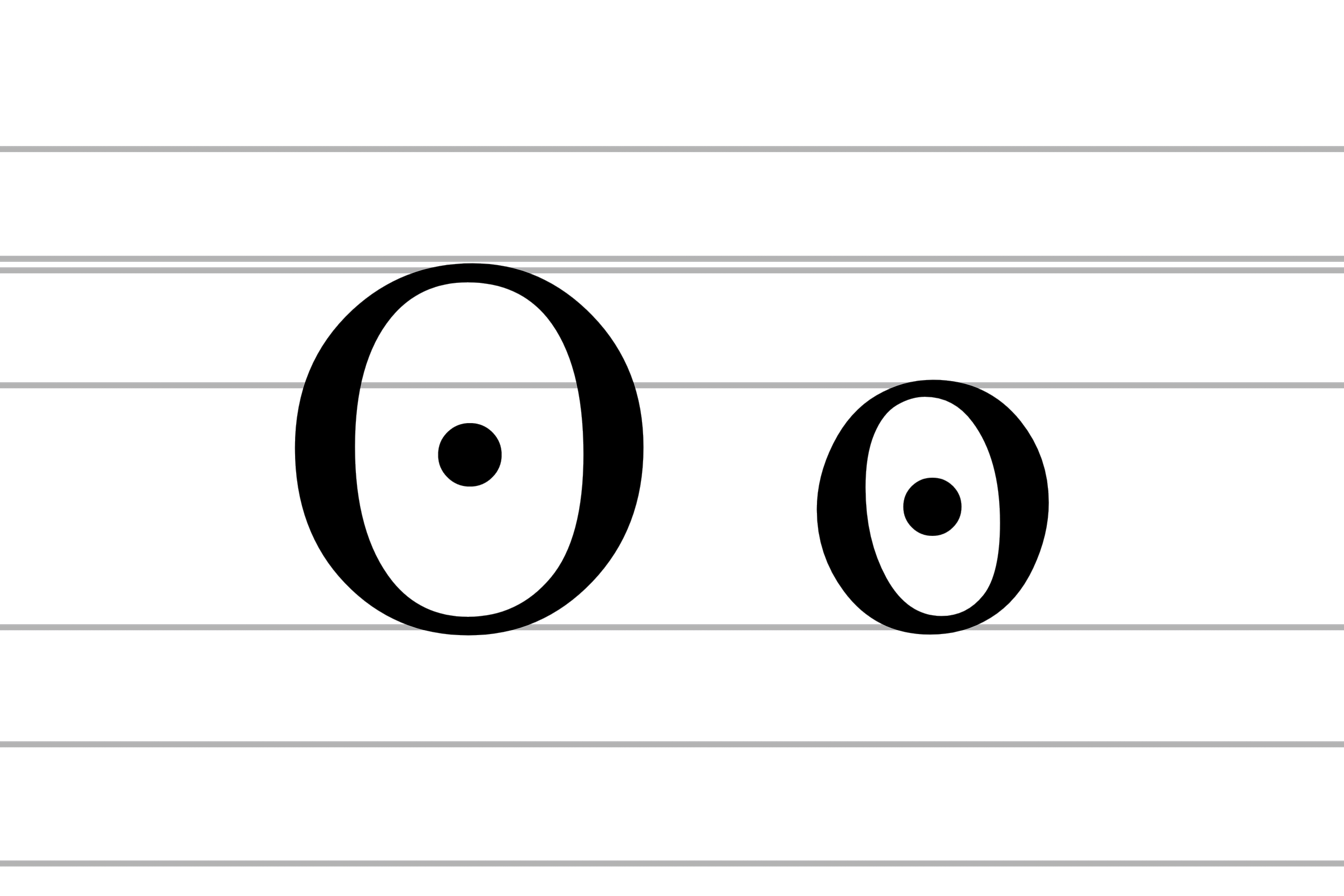
Monocular O

Monocular O (Ꙩ ꙩ) is one of the rare glyph variants of Cyrillic letter O. This glyph variant was used in certain manuscripts in the root word ꙩко "eye", and also in some other functions, for example, in the word- and syllable-initial position. It is used in some late birchbark letters of the 14th and 15th centuries, where it is usually differentiated from a regular о, used after consonants, also by width, being a broad On (ѻ) with a dot inside.

The letter resembles International Phonetic Alphabet bilabial click (ʘ) and the Gothic letter hwair (𐍈).

== Binocular O ==
Binocular O

Binocular O (Ꙫ ꙫ) is found in certain manuscripts in the plural or dual forms of the root word eye, like Ꙫчи.

A similar jocular glyph (called "double-dot wide O") has been suggested as a phonetic symbol for the "nasal-ingressive velar trill", a paralinguistic impression of a snort, due to the graphic resemblance to a pig snout.

== Double monocular O ==
Double monocular O

Double monocular O (Ꙭ ꙭ) is one of the exotic glyph variants of the Cyrillic letter O. This glyph variant can be found in certain manuscripts in the plural or dual forms of the word eye, for example ꙭчи "[two] eyes".

== Multiocular O ==
Multiocular O (ꙮ) is a unique glyph variant found in a single 15th-century manuscript (therefore a hapax legomenon), in the Old Church Slavonic phrase серафими многоꙮчитїи (abbreviated мн̑оꙮ҆читїи̑; serafimi mnogoočitii, 'many-eyed seraphim'). It was documented by Yefim Karsky in 1928 in the Buslaev Psalter, a psalter (copy of the Book of Psalms with additional material) originally believed to be from around 1429, now dated to c. 1487 – c. 1490 and found in the collection of the Trinity Lavra of St. Sergius.

The character was proposed for inclusion into Unicode in 2007 and incorporated as character U+A66E ꙮ CYRILLIC LETTER MULTIOCULAR O in Unicode version 5.1 (2008). The representative glyph had seven eyes and sat on the baseline. However, in 2021, following a tweet highlighting the character, it came to linguist Michael Everson's attention that the character in the original manuscript was actually made up of ten eyes. After a 2022 proposal to change the character to reflect this, it was updated later that year for Unicode 15.0 to have ten eyes and to extend below the baseline.

The letter in the original manuscript.

Multiocular O (proper form with ten eyes)

The incorrect seven-eyed form originally implemented into Unicode (2007–2022).

== Double O ==
Double O

Double O (Ꚙ ꚙ) is a variant of the letter О in the Cyrillic script. It is found in some early Old Church Slavonic manuscripts, where it is used in place of ⟨О⟩ in the words двꚙе "two" and ꚙбо "both", as well as their derivatives ꚙбанадесять "all twelve", and двꚙюнадесять "twelve". The Cyrillic "double O" resembles the Latin-script double-o ligature (ꝏ) and the Infinity symbol (∞).

== Crossed O ==
Crossed O

Crossed O (Ꚛ ꚛ) is a glyph variant of Cyrillic O with the addition of a cross, used in Old Church Slavonic. The crossed O is primarily used in the word ꚛкрест (around, in the region of) in early Slavonic manuscripts, whose component крест means 'cross'.

== Broad On ==
Broad On

Broad On, also known as Round Omega (Ѻ ѻ; italics: Ѻ ѻ) is a positional and orthographical variant of the Cyrillic O. On (ѻнъ, onŭ) is a traditional name of Cyrillic letter О; these names are still in use in the Church Slavonic alphabet.

Broad On is used only in the Church Slavonic language. In its alphabet (in primers and grammar books), broad and regular shapes of О share the same position, as they are not considered different letters. Uppercase is typically represented by broad Ѻ, and lowercase is either regular о or dual: both broad ѻ and regular о (in the same way as Greek uppercase Σ is accompanied with two lowercases σ, ς). Phonetically, broad Ѻ ѻ is the same as regular О о.

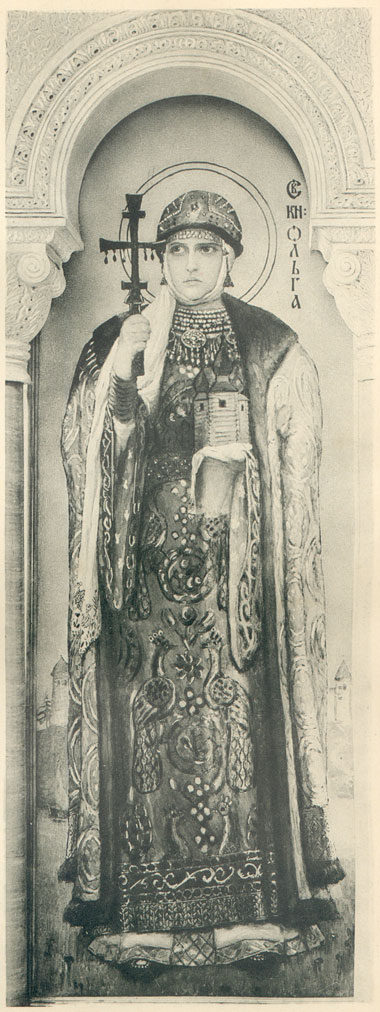
St. Olga icon at St Volodymyr's Cathedral, Kyiv. The letter can be seen in the inscription above her left shoulder.

In standard Church Slavonic orthography (since the middle of the 17th century until present time), the broad shape of letter On is used instead of the regular shape of the same letter in the following cases:

- as the first letter of a word's root, which could fall:
  - at the beginning of the word: (ѻгнь, ѻтрокъ),
  - after a prefix: (праѻтецъ),
  - after another root in compound words (ѻбоюдуѻстрый);
- in the middle of the root in two geographical names (іѻрданъ—Jordan River, іѻппіа—city of Jaffa) and their derivatives;
- as the numerical sign to represent the number 70 (However, Church Slavonic editions printed outside the Russian Empire have often ignored this rule and used regular о as the numerical sign).

Historically, Broad On was also used in the later Old Russian period, including documents, letters and other vernacular texts, to signal the initial position of a word or a syllable or occasionally to mark a closed vowel (developed in North Russian dialects since the 14th century). It is found in birch bark manuscripts and in some other Russian texts. Other glyphs could be used in the same functions, including Monocular O and Cyrillic Omega.

=== Name ===
Broad On has no standard traditional name. The names used in literature (e.g. wide on) are shape-based or functional descriptions. A name from certain Russian sources, он польское, on pol'skoye (lit. "Polish O"), also points to the round shape of the letter, because Latin fonts from Poland had round "O", and the typical old Cyrillic "O" was lens-shaped and condensed. Now the character is often referred to by its conventional Unicode name "Round Omega".

== Computing codes ==
Character information
Preview	Ꙩ		ꙩ		Ꙫ		ꙫ		ꙮ	
Unicode name	CYRILLIC CAPITAL LETTER MONOCULAR O		CYRILLIC SMALL LETTER MONOCULAR O		CYRILLIC CAPITAL LETTER BINOCULAR O		CYRILLIC SMALL LETTER BINOCULAR O		CYRILLIC LETTER MULTIOCULAR O	
Encodings	decimal	hex	dec	hex	dec	hex	dec	hex	dec	hex
Unicode	42600	U+A668	42601	U+A669	42602	U+A66A	42603	U+A66B	42606	U+A66E
UTF-8	234 153 168	EA 99 A8	234 153 169	EA 99 A9	234 153 170	EA 99 AA	234 153 171	EA 99 AB	234 153 174	EA 99 AE
Numeric character reference	&#42600;	&#xA668;	&#42601;	&#xA669;	&#42602;	&#xA66A;	&#42603;	&#xA66B;	&#42606;	&#xA66E;

Character information
Preview	Ꚙ		ꚙ		Ꚛ		ꚛ		Ѻ		ѻ	
Unicode name	CYRILLIC CAPITAL LETTER DOUBLE O		CYRILLIC SMALL LETTER DOUBLE O		CYRILLIC CAPITAL LETTER CROSSED O		CYRILLIC SMALL LETTER CROSSED O		CYRILLIC CAPITAL LETTER ROUND OMEGA		CYRILLIC SMALL LETTER ROUND OMEGA	
Encodings	decimal	hex	dec	hex	dec	hex	dec	hex	dec	hex	dec	hex
Unicode	42648	U+A698	42649	U+A699	42650	U+A69A	42651	U+A69B	1146	U+047A	1147	U+047B
UTF-8	234 154 152	EA 9A 98	234 154 153	EA 9A 99	234 154 154	EA 9A 9A	234 154 155	EA 9A 9B	209 186	D1 BA	209 187	D1 BB
Numeric character reference	&#42648;	&#xA698;	&#42649;	&#xA699;	&#42650;	&#xA69A;	&#42651;	&#xA69B;	&#1146;	&#x47A;	&#1147;	&#x47B;

== See also ==
- Cyrillic script in Unicode
- Omega (Cyrillic)
- Latin letter ʘ (ʘ)
- Gothic letter Hwair (𐍈)
- Dotted zero
