= English Dialect Society =

First dialect society founded in England

The English Dialect Society was the first dialect society founded in England. It was founded in 1873, but wound up after the publication of Joseph Wright's English Dialect Dictionary had begun.

== History ==
Such a society was first proposed by Aldis Wright in 1870. It was founded in 1873 with W. W. Skeat as its secretary. The society's publications were divided into four series: bibliographies, reprinted glossaries, original glossaries and miscellanies. One unsatisfactory feature of the publications is that they are often arranged by counties whereas dialect boundaries rarely coincide with county boundaries. Some of the material published by the society was included in Joseph Wright's English Dialect Dictionary. Collectors of dialect words were discouraged from proposing etymologies on the ground that in so doing they might distort the meaning of the words they were collecting. In 1876 the society's headquarters was transferred from Cambridge to Manchester where it remained until a further transfer to Oxford in 1893. The society's library remained at Manchester and was presented to the Manchester Free Library. It consisted of some 800 books and pamphlets. John Howard Nodal became honorary secretary and director of the society in 1874. He continued in office to the dissolution of the society in 1896. The following year the first of the regional dialect societies in England was founded in Yorkshire. As of October 2026, this still exists as the Yorkshire Dialect Society.

== Publications ==
The publications include:

- F. K. Robinson A Glossary of Words Used in the Neighbourhood of Whitby. English Dialect Society, 1876.
- Arthur Benoni Evans Leicestershire Words, Phrases, and Proverbs; enlarged edition, edited by Sebastian Evans; English Dialect Society, 1881.
- Robertson, John Drummond (1890). Reynolds, Henry H. (ed.). A glossary of dialect & archaic words used in the County of Gloucester. London: Published for the English Dialect Society by Kegan Paul, Trench, Trübner.
- Courtney, Margaret Ann; Couch, Thomas Quiller (1880). Glossary of Words in Use in Cornwall. English Dialect Society.
- Courtney, Margaret Ann; Couch, Thomas Quiller (1880). "Glossary of Words in Use in Cornwall". Publications. 27. English Dialect Society.
- Salisbury, J. (1894). "A Glossary of Words and Phrases Used in S. E. Worcestershire, Together with Some of the Sayings, Customs, Superstitions, Charms, &c. Common in that District". Publications. 72. English Dialect Society.
- google books: bibliogroup:"English Dialect Society"

== Source ==
- G. L. Brook (1965) English Dialects; 2nd ed. London: Andre Deutsch; pp. 144, 155-156.

== See also ==
- Shorrocks, Graham (2001). "The dialectology of English in the British Isles". in History of the Language Sciences, 2: 1553-1562.
