= O (Cyrillic) =

Cyrillic letter

- О о

Usage
- Writing system: Cyrillic
- Type: Alphabetic
- Language of origin: Old Church Slavonic
- Sound values: [o], [ɔ], [ɐ], [ɒ], [ʌ]
- In Unicode: U+041E, U+043E

History
Development
D4
      - Ο ο
        - О о
- Transliterations: O o

Other
- Associated numbers: 70 (Cyrillic numerals)

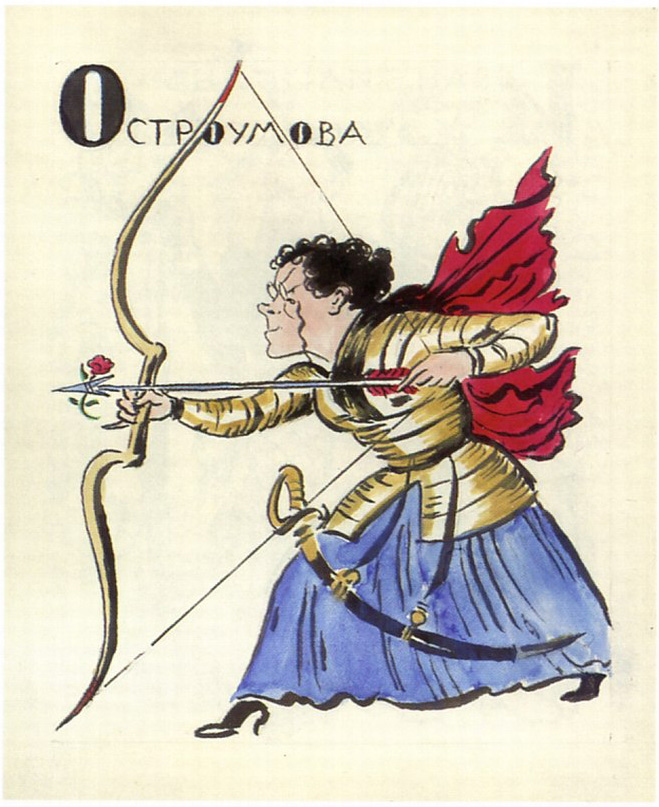
Anna Ostroumova-Lebedeva as an illustration for the Cyrillic letter О in "Mir iskusstva ABC" by Mstislav Dobuzhinsky

О (О о; italics: О о or О о; italics: О о) is a letter of the Cyrillic script.

The letter most commonly represents the sound /ɔ/, like the pronunciation of ⟨au⟩ in "aura". In Russian and Serbo-Croatian, it represents the sound /o/.

== History ==
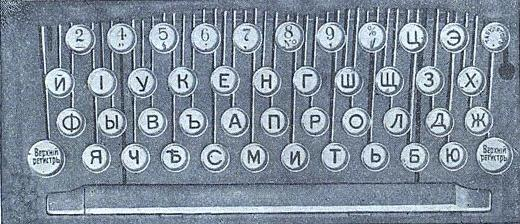
Some old Russian typewriters like this one were manufactured without the digit 0 as the letter O could be used instead.

The Cyrillic letter О was derived from the Greek letter Omicron (Ο ο).

== Form ==
=== Modern fonts ===
In modern-style typefaces, the Cyrillic letter O looks exactly like the Latin letter O ⟨O o⟩ and the Greek letter Omicron ⟨Ο ο⟩.

=== Church Slavonic printed fonts and Slavonic manuscripts ===
Historical typefaces (like poluustav (semi-uncial), a standard font style for the Church Slavonic typography) and old manuscripts represent several additional glyph variants of Cyrillic O, both for decorative and orthographic (sometimes also "hieroglyphic") purposes, namely:

- broad variant (Ѻ/ѻ), used mostly as a word initial letter (see Broad On for more details);
- narrow variant, ᲂ, being used now in Synodal Church Slavonic editions as the first element of digraph Oy/oy (see Uk (Cyrillic) for more details), and in the editions of Old Believers for unstressed "o" as well;
- variant with a cross inside (Crossed O), Ꚛ, used in certain manuscripts as the initial letter of words окрестъ 'around, nearby' (the root of this Slavonic word, крест, means 'cross') and округъ 'district, neighbourhood' with their derivatives;
- "eyed" variant (Monocular O) with a dot inside (Ꙩ/ꙩ), used in certain manuscripts in spelling of word око 'eye' and its derivatives. In many other texts, including the birchbark letters, the monocular O was not used as a hieroglyph but largely as a synonym of Broad On signalling the word-initial position;
- "two-eyed" variants (Binocular O) with two dots inside (Ꙫ/ꙫ or Ꙭ/ꙭ), also double "O" without dots inside were used in certain manuscripts in spelling of dual/plural forms of the words with the same root 'eye';
- "many-eyed" variant (Multiocular O), ꙮ, used in certain manuscripts in spelling of the same root when embedded into word многоочитый 'many-eyed' (an attribute of seraphim).

== Usage ==
In Russian, O is used word-initially, after another vowel, and after non-palatalized consonants. Because of a vowel reduction processes, the Russian /o/ phoneme may have a number of pronunciations in unstressed syllables, including [ɐ] and [ə]. It is the most common letter in the Russian language.

In Macedonian, Bulgarian, Ukrainian and Belarusian, the letter represents the sound /ɔ/.

In Tuvan the Cyrillic letter can be written as a double vowel.

== Related letters and other similar characters ==
- Ο ο : Greek letter Omicron
- O o : Latin letter O
- Ó ó : Latin letter Ó
- Օ օ - Armenian letter O
- 0 : Digit Zero
- Ё ё : Cyrillic letter Yo
- Ѻ ѻ : Cyrillic letter Broad On
- Ӧ ӧ : Cyrillic letter O with diaeresis
- Ө ө : Cyrillic letter Oe
- Ӫ ӫ : Cyrillic letter Oe with diaeresis
- Ҩ ҩ : Cyrillic letter O-hook

== Computing codes ==
Character information
Preview	О		о	
Unicode name	CYRILLIC CAPITAL LETTER O		CYRILLIC SMALL LETTER O	
Encodings	decimal	hex	dec	hex
Unicode	1054	U+041E	1086	U+043E
UTF-8	208 158	D0 9E	208 190	D0 BE
Numeric character reference	&#1054;	&#x41E;	&#1086;	&#x43E;
Named character reference	&Ocy;		&ocy;	
KOI8-R and KOI8-U	239	EF	207	CF
Code page 855	215	D7	214	D6
Windows-1251	206	CE	238	EE
ISO-8859-5	190	BE	222	DE
Macintosh Cyrillic	142	8E	238	EE

Exotic glyph variants of Cyrillic O are available only in Unicode:

- broad Ѻ/ѻ:
  - CYRILLIC CAPITAL LETTER ROUND OMEGA: U+047A
  - CYRILLIC SMALL LETTER ROUND OMEGA: U+047B
- narrow ᲂ does not just represent itself, but also used in digraph Oy/oy:
  - CYRILLIC SMALL LETTER NARROW O: U+1C82
  - CYRILLIC CAPITAL LETTER UK: U+0478 (deprecated in favor of combination of Cyrillic letters О and у, U+041E U+0443)
  - CYRILLIC SMALL LETTER UK: U+0479 (deprecated in favor of combination of Cyrillic letters о and у, U+043E U+0443 or U+1C82 U+0443)
- with a cross inside (Ꚛ/ꚛ):
  - CYRILLIC CAPITAL LETTER CROSSED O: U+A69A
  - CYRILLIC SMALL LETTER CROSSED O: U+A69B
- doubled Ꚙ/ꚙ:
  - CYRILLIC CAPITAL LETTER DOUBLE O: U+A698
  - CYRILLIC SMALL LETTER DOUBLE O: U+A699
- eyed Ꙩ/ꙩ:
  - CYRILLIC CAPITAL LETTER MONOCULAR O: U+A668
  - CYRILLIC SMALL LETTER MONOCULAR O: U+A669
- two-eyed (Ꙫ/ꙫ, Ꙭ/ꙭ):
  - CYRILLIC CAPITAL LETTER BINOCULAR O: U+A66A
  - CYRILLIC SMALL LETTER BINOCULAR O: U+A66B
  - CYRILLIC CAPITAL LETTER DOUBLE MONOCULAR O: U+A66C
  - CYRILLIC SMALL LETTER DOUBLE MONOCULAR O: U+A66D
- many-eyed ꙮ:
  - CYRILLIC LETTER MULTIOCULAR O: U+A66E
- combining O for Church Slavonic abbreviations (as трⷪца = троица '(Holy) Trinity'):
  - COMBINING CYRILLIC LETTER O: 2DEA
