= O with diaeresis (Cyrillic) =

Cyrillic letter

- Ӧ ӧ

Usage
- Writing system: Cyrillic
- Type: Alphabetic
- Language of origin: Altai, Khanty, Khakas, Komi, Kurdish, Mari, Shor, Udmurt
- Sound values: [ø], [ə], [ʊ], [œ], [ʌ]

History
- Development: О: о: Ӧ ӧ

O with diaeresis (Ӧ ӧ; italics: Ӧ ӧ) is a letter of the Cyrillic script. In all its forms it looks exactly like the Latin letter Ö (Ö ö Ö ö).

O with diaeresis is used in the alphabets of the Altai, Khanty, Khakas, Komi, Kurdish, Mari, Shor and Udmurt languages.

== Usage ==
In Altai, Khakas, Khanty and Shor, it represents the close-mid front rounded vowel /ø/.

In Komi, it represents the schwa /ə/, like the ⟨a⟩ in "allow".

In Kurdish, it represents the near-close near-back rounded vowel /ʊ/, like the ⟨oo⟩ in "book".

In Mari, it represents the open-mid front rounded vowel /œ/, similar to /ø/.

In Udmurt, it represents the open-mid back unrounded vowel /ʌ/, like the ⟨u⟩ in "up".

In Russian books until the beginning of the 20th century, the letter Ӧ has been sporadically used instead of Ё in foreign names and loanwords (for example, the city of Cologne, Germany, which is Köln in German, might have been rendered in Russian as "Кӧльн").

In Tatar, this letter appeared in the 1861 Cyrillic orthography by Nikolay Ilminsky. This letter was replaced by Ө in 1939.

O with diaeresis and macron (Ӧ̄ ӧ̄; italics: Ӧ̄ ӧ̄) is a letter from the Cyrillic script. It is used in the southern dialects of the Selkup language, to indicate a long Ӧ.

== Computing codes ==
Character information
| Preview | Ӧ | | ӧ | |
|---|---|---|---|---|
| Unicode name | CYRILLIC CAPITAL LETTER; O WITH DIAERESIS | | CYRILLIC SMALL LETTER; O WITH DIAERESIS | |
| Encodings | decimal | hex | dec | hex |
| Unicode | 1254 | U+04E6 | 1255 | U+04E7 |
| UTF-8 | 211 166 | D3 A6 | 211 167 | D3 A7 |
| Numeric character reference | &#1254; | &#x4E6; | &#1255; | &#x4E7; |

== See also ==
- Ö ö : Latin letter O with diaeresis - an Azerbaijani, Estonian, Finnish, German, Hungarian, Icelandic, Swedish, Turkish, and Turkmen letter.
- Ơ ơ : Latin letter O with horn, used in Vietnamese language
- Ø ø : Latin letter O with stroke
- Õ õ : Latin letter O with tilde, used in Estonian
- Œ œ : Ligature Oe
- О о : Cyrillic letter O
- Ө ө : Cyrillic letter Oe
- Ӫ ӫ : Cyrillic letter Oe with diaeresis
- Cyrillic characters in Unicode
