= Royal Bounty Fund =

UK government fund

The Royal Bounty Fund was a special British government fund originally set up in 1782 by Edmund Burke. The operation of the fund was always shrouded in secrecy. Gifts, grants and pensions were paid out from the fund under the patronage of the prime minister and no accounts were ever published. From as early as 1802 Treasury officials expressed concerns about the operation of the fund but it was not until 2002 that it was eventually wound down by Tony Blair. One known recipient of funds, granted by A. J. Balfour when he was First Lord of the Treasury, was for the completion of The English Dialect Dictionary.
