= Joseph Wright (linguist) =

English philologist and Oxford professor

Joseph Wright FBA
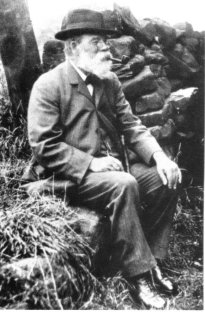
- Joseph Wright
- Born: 31 October 1855; Idle, West Yorkshire, England
- Died: 27 February 1930 (aged 74); Oxford, Oxfordshire, England
- Spouse: Elizabeth Mary Lea (m. 1896)

Academic background
- Education: Heidelberg University
- Influences: Max Müller, Hermann Osthoff

Academic work
- Institutions: University of Oxford
- Main interests: Germanic languages English dialects
- Notable works: The English Dialect Dictionary
- Influenced: J. R. R. Tolkien

Joseph Wright FBA (31 October 1855 – 27 February 1930) was an English Germanic philologist who rose from humble origins to become Professor of Comparative Philology at the University of Oxford.

== Early life ==
Wright was born in Idle, near Bradford in the former West Riding of Yorkshire, the second son of Dufton Wright, a woollen cloth weaver and quarryman, and his wife Sarah Ann (née Atkinson). He started work as a "donkey-boy" in a quarry around 1862, at the age of six, leading a donkey-drawn cart full of tools to the smithy to be sharpened. The family moved to the Middlesbrough area when Dufton found work there in the ironstone mines at Eston. In the 1861 Census, the family were living at Kirkleatham. Despite having partially grown up in this area, Joseph Wright never wrote a word on the dialect of the Middlesbrough area.

On returning to Yorkshire, he later became a bobbin doffer – responsible for removing and replacing full bobbins – in a mill in Sir Titus Salt's model village of Saltaire in Yorkshire. Although Wright learned letters and numbers at the Salt's Factory School, he was unable to read a newspaper until he was 15. He later said of this time: "Reading and writing, for me, were as remote as any of the sciences."

By now a wool-sorter earning a pound a week, after 1870 Wright became increasingly fascinated with languages, and began attending night school to study French, German and Latin, as well as maths and shorthand. At the age of 18, around 1874, he started his own night school, charging his colleagues twopence a week.

By 1876 Wright had saved £40 and could afford a term's study at the University of Heidelberg. He walked to Heidelberg from Antwerp, a distance of more than 250 miles (400 km), to save money.

After returning to Yorkshire, Wright continued his studies at the Yorkshire College of Science (later the University of Leeds) while working as a schoolmaster. A former pupil of Wright's recalled: "With a piece of chalk [he would] draw illustrative diagrams at the same time with each hand, and talk while he was doing it.

Wright later returned to Heidelberg, and in 1885 he completed his PhD dissertation, Qualitative and Quantitative Changes of the Indo-Germanic Vowel System in Greek under Hermann Osthoff.

== Career ==
In 1888, after his second return from Germany, Wright was offered a post at the University of Oxford by Professor Max Müller, and became a lecturer to the Association for the Higher Education of Women and deputy lecturer in German at the Taylor Institution. From 1891 to 1901 Wright was Deputy Professor and from 1901 to 1925, as Müller's successor, Professor of Comparative Philology at Oxford.

Wright specialised in the Germanic languages, and wrote a range of introductory grammars for Old English, Middle English, Old High German, Middle High German and Gothic, which were still being revised and reprinted 50 years after his death. He also wrote a historical grammar of German.

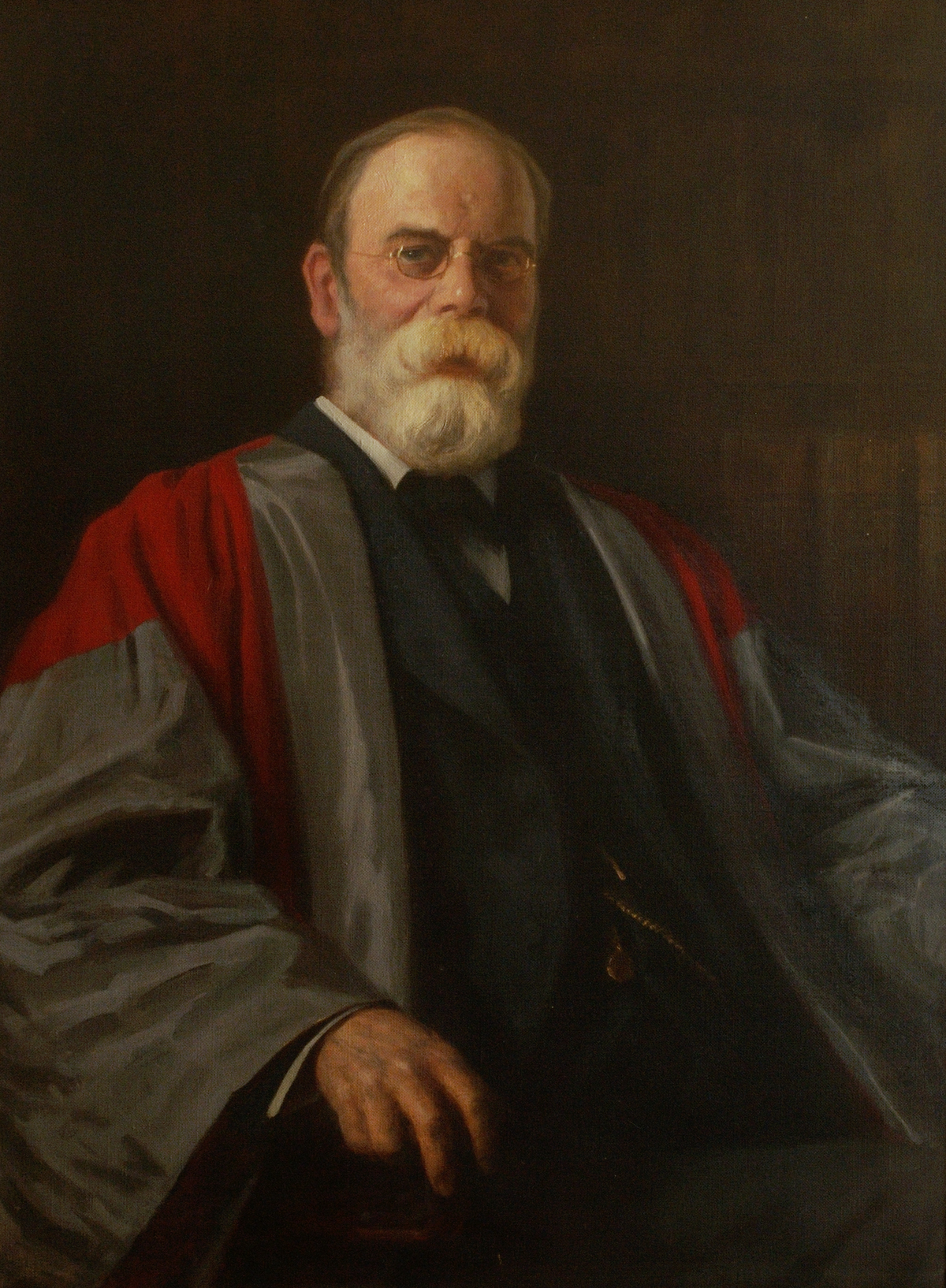
Portrait of Joseph Wright by Ernest Moore, 1926, in the Taylorian, Oxford.

Wright had a strong interest in English dialects. His book A Grammar of the Dialect of Windhill was "the first truly scientific monograph on an English dialect."

Wright's greatest achievement is considered to be the editing of the six-volume English Dialect Dictionary, which he published between 1898 and 1905, partly at his own expense. Other funds were contributed by Professor W. W. Skeat, founder and president of the English Dialect Society, and A. J. Balfour, at the time First Lord of the Treasury, made a grant from the Royal Bounty Fund. The Dictionary remains a definitive work, a snapshot of the dialects of spoken English in England at the end of the 19th century. In the course of his work on the Dictionary he formed a committee to gather Yorkshire material, which gave rise in 1897 to the Yorkshire Dialect Society, the world's oldest surviving dialect society. Wright had been offered a position at a Canadian university, which would have paid him an annual salary of 500 pounds, a very generous salary at the time, but he opted to stay in Oxford and finish the Dictionary without any financial backing from a sponsor. In the course of editing Dictionary (1898) Wright corresponded regularly with Thomas Hardy about the Dorset dialect.

On 25 June 1904 Wright was elected to the fellowship of the British Academy. He was also the recipient of a number of honorary degrees, largely in recognition for his work on the English Dialect Dictionary. An Honorary DCL from Durham in 1892 was followed by honours from Aberdeen (Hon. LLD, 1902), Leeds (Hon. LLD, 1904), and Dublin (Hon. LittD, 1906). In 1926, after his resignation from the chair, Oxford awarded him an honorary DLitt degree. In the same year, German colleagues dedicated Vol. 60 of the journal Englische Studien to him as a Festschrift to mark his 70th birthday in the preceding year.

In 1925 Wright became the inaugural recipient of the British Academy's Biennial Prize for English Literature (now the Sir Israel Gollancz Prize), awarded for publications on Early English Language and Literature.

Wright's papers are in the Bodleian Library at the University of Oxford.

== Personal life ==
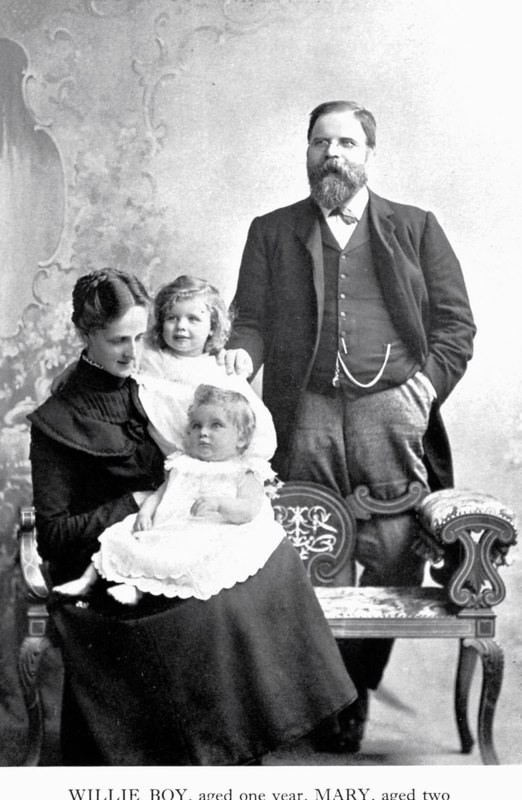
Joseph and Elizabeth Wright with their children, c. 1907.

In 1896 Wright married Elizabeth Mary Lea (1863–1958), with whom he co-authored his Old and Middle English Grammars. She also wrote a book, Rustic Speech and Folklore (Oxford University Press 1913), in which she refers to their walking and cycling journeys in the Yorkshire Dales, as well as various articles and essays.

The couple had two children, Willie Boy and Mary, both of whom died in childhood.

Wright and his wife were known for their hospitality to their students. They often invited a dozen or more, both men and women, to their home for Yorkshire Sunday teas. On these occasions Wright performed his party trick of making his Aberdeen Terrier Jack lick his lips when Wright said the Gothic words for fig tree, smakka bagms.

Wright's "star pupil" was Edith Wardale who had gained an early doctorate from the University of Zurich. He allowed her to lecture for the Faculty Board of Medieval and Modern Languages in 1914 several years before other faculties allowed women to teach. He believed that women were entitled to become university students, but believed that they should not be voting members of the university, saying that they were, "less independent in judgement than men and apt to run in a body like sheep".

Although his energies were for the most part directed into his work, Wright also enjoyed gardening, and followed Yorkshire cricket and football teams.

At the age of seventy-four Wright succumbed to pneumonia and died at his home, "Thackley", 119 Banbury Road, Oxford, on 27 February 1930. His last word was "Dictionary". He was buried in Wolvercote Cemetery, Oxford. In 1932 his widow published The Life of Joseph Wright.

== Legacy ==
Wright's publications have been of lasting influence. His pioneering work on the Windhill dialect inspired "a vigorous local monograph tradition... patterned after it." Writing of the Dialect Dictionary and Dialect Grammar in 2001, Shorrocks remarks that, "Neither of these works - whatever their shortcomings - has been superseded yet". The grammars have remained in print (sometimes in revised editions) and were still in use by students in the late 20th century, and his Gothic Grammar, in particular, remains on university reading lists over a century after its first publication.

Wright had a significant personal influence on J. R. R. Tolkien and was one of his tutors at Oxford. Studying the Grammar of the Gothic Language (1910) with Wright seems to have been a turning point in Tolkien's life. Writing to his son Michael in 1963, Tolkien reflected on his time studying with Wright:

Years before I had rejected as disgusting cynicism by an old vulgarian the words of warning given me by old Joseph Wright. "What do you take Oxford for, lad?" "A university, a place of learning." "Nay, lad, it's a factory! And what's it making? I'll tell you. It's making fees. Get that in your head, and you'll begin to understand what goes on." Alas! by 1935 I now knew that it was perfectly true. At any rate as a key to dons' behaviour.

When in 1925 Tolkien applied for the Rawlinson and Bosworth Chair of Anglo-Saxon at Oxford, Wright wrote a letter of recommendation. After Wright's death, Tolkien was one of the executors of his will.

Wright was greatly admired by Virginia Woolf, who wrote of him in her diary:

The triumph of learning is that it leaves something done solidly for ever. Everybody knows now about dialect, owing to his dixery.

Wright was Woolf's inspiration for the character of "Mr Brook" in The Pargiters, an early draft of The Years (1937).

In 1963, Wright's estate funded the Joseph Wright Scholarship at the University of Leeds to support "postgraduate researchers wishing to undertake research degree study in English or German languages or literatures."

== In popular culture ==
In the 2019 biopic Tolkien Professor Wright is played by Derek Jacobi.

== Publications ==
- Wright, Joseph (1888). An Old High-German Primer. Oxford: Clarendon Press.
- ———— (1888). A Middle High-German Primer. Oxford: Clarendon Press.
- ———— (1891). "Englische Mundarten". In Paul, Hermann (ed.). Grundriss der germanischen Philologie. Vol. I. Strassburg: Trübner. pp. 975–981.
- ———— (1892). A Grammar of the Dialect of Windhill in the West Riding of Yorkshire: Illustrated by a Series of Dialect Specimens, Phonetically Rendered; with a Glossarial Index of the Words Used in the Grammar and Specimens. London: Kegan Paul.
- ———— (1892). A Primer of the Gothic Language. Oxford: Clarendon Press.
- ————, ed. (1898–1905). The English Dialect Dictionary. Vol. I–VI. London: Henry Frowde. Vol. 1: A-C • Vol. 2: D-G • Vol. 3: H-L • Vol. 4: M-Q • Vol. 5: R-S • Vol. 6: T-Z, with supplement, bibliography and grammar

Reprint: Wright, Joseph, ed. (1981). The English Dialect Dictionary. Vol. I–VI. Oxford: Oxford University Press. ISBN 978-0195804973.

- ———— (1905). The English Dialect Grammar, comprising the dialects of England, of the Shetland and Orkney islands, and of those parts of Scotland, Ireland & Wales where English is habitually spoken. Oxford: Oxford University Press.
- ———— (1907). Historical German Grammar. Vol. I–II. London: Oxford University Press.
- ———— (1910). Grammar of the Gothic Language. Oxford: Clarendon Press.
- ———— (1912). Comparative Grammar of the Greek Language. London: Oxford University Press.

with Elizabeth Mary Wright

- Wright, Joseph; Wright, Elizabeth Mary (1908). Old English Grammar. London: Oxford University Press.
- ————; ———— (1923). Elementary Old English Grammar. London: Oxford University Press. (Abridgement of preceding work.)
- ————; ———— (1928) [1923]. Elementary Middle English Grammar. London: Oxford University Press.
- ————; ———— (1954) [1924]. An Elementary Historical New English Grammar. London: Oxford University Press.
