= High Hurstwood =

Village in East Sussex, England

Coordinates: 51.01637°N 0.12918°E

High Hurstwood is a village in the Wealden district of East Sussex.
