= Grammar of the Gothic Language =

Book by Joseph Wright published in 1910

- Second edition
- Author: Joseph Wright
- Language: English
- Subject: Gothic language
- Genre: Grammar
- Publisher: Clarendon Press
- Publication date: 1910
- Publication place: United Kingdom
- Pages: ix + 366 pp.
- OCLC: 697676

Grammar of the Gothic Language is a book by Joseph Wright describing the extinct Gothic language, first published in 1910. It includes the language's development from Proto-Indo-European (then known as Indo-Germanic) and Proto-Germanic (Primitive Germanic), and part of Ulfilas's bible translation. It superseded Wright's earlier A Primer of the Gothic Language, and has been reprinted many times throughout the 20th century.
