= Voiced retroflex flap =

Consonantal sound represented by ⟨ɽ⟩ in IPA

ɽ
- IPA number: 125

Audio sample
- source · help

Encoding
- Entity (decimal): &#637;
- Unicode (hex): U+027D
- X-SAMPA: r`
- Braille: ⠲ (braille pattern dots-256) ⠗ (braille pattern dots-1235)
Image

A voiced retroflex flap is a type of consonantal sound, used in some spoken languages. The symbol in the International Phonetic Alphabet that represents this sound is ⟨ɽ⟩, a letter r with a tail.

== Features ==
Features of a voiced retroflex flap:

- Its manner of articulation is tap or flap, which means it is produced with a single contraction of the muscles so that one articulator (usually the tongue) is thrown against another.
- Its place of articulation is retroflex, which prototypically means it is articulated subapical (with the tip of the tongue curled up), but more generally, it means that it is postalveolar without being palatalized. That is, besides the prototypical subapical articulation, the tongue can be apical (pointed) or, in some fricatives, laminal (flat).
- Its phonation is voiced, which means the vocal cords vibrate during the articulation.
- It is an oral consonant, which means that air is not allowed to escape through the nose.
- It is a median consonant, which means it is produced by directing the airstream down the midline of the tongue, rather than to the sides.
- Its airstream mechanism is pulmonic, which means it is articulated by pushing air only with the intercostal muscles and abdominal muscles, as in most speech sounds.

== Occurrence ==
Language		Word	IPA	Meaning	Notes
Bengali		গাড়ি	[ɡaɽi]	'car'	Apical postalveolar. See Bengali phonology
Dutch	North Brabant	riem	[ɽim]	'belt'	A rare word-initial variant of /r/. Realization of /r/ varies considerably among dialects. See Dutch phonology
Dutch	Northern Netherlands	riem	[ɽim]	'belt'	A rare word-initial variant of /r/. Realization of /r/ varies considerably among dialects. See Dutch phonology
Elfdalian		luv	[ɽʏːv]	'permission'	
Enga		yála	[jɑɽɑ]	'shame'	
Gokana		bele	[beːɽeː]	'we'	Apical postalveolar. Allophone of /l/, medially between vowels within the morpheme, and finally in the morpheme before a following vowel in the same word. It can be a postalveolar trill or simply [l] instead.
Hausa		bara	[bəɽä]	'servant'	Represented in Arabic script with ⟨ر⟩
Hindustani	Hindi	बड़ा	[bəɽäː]	'big'	Apical postalveolar; contrasts unaspirated and aspirated forms. See Hindustani phonology
Hindustani	Urdu	بڑا	[bəɽäː]	'big'	Apical postalveolar; contrasts unaspirated and aspirated forms. See Hindustani phonology
Kashmiri		لٔڑکہٕ	[ləɽkɨ]	'boy'	
Nepali		भाड़ा	[bʱäɽä]	'rent'	Apical postalveolar; postvocalic allophone of /ɖ, ɖʱ/. See Nepali phonology
Norwegian	Central dialects	klorte	[ˈkʰɽûːʈə̌]	'scratched'	Allophone of /l/ and /r/. In Urban East Norwegian it often alternates with the alveolar [ɾ], save for a small number of words. See Norwegian phonology
Norwegian	Eastern dialects	klorte	[ˈkʰɽûːʈə̌]	'scratched'	Allophone of /l/ and /r/. In Urban East Norwegian it often alternates with the alveolar [ɾ], save for a small number of words. See Norwegian phonology
Odia		ଗାଡ଼ି	[ɡäɽiː]	'car'	Apical postalveolar; postvocalic allophone of /ɖ, ɖʱ/.
Parkari Koli		ۿُونَواڙ	[ɦuːnaʋaːɽ]	'desolate, deserted'	
Portuguese	Some European speakers	falar	[fɐˈläɽ]	'to speak'	Allophone of /ɾ/. See Portuguese phonology
Portuguese	Brazilian caipira speakers	madeira	[mäˈd̪eɽə]	'wood'	Allophone of /ɾ/. See Portuguese phonology
Portuguese	Some sertanejo speakers	gargalhar	[ɡäɽɡäˈʎäɽ]	'to guffaw'	Allophone of /ɾ/. See Portuguese phonology
Punjabi	Gurmukhi	ਘੋੜਾ	[k̠òːɽaː]	'horse'	
Punjabi	Shahmukhi	گھوڑا	[k̠òːɽaː]	'horse'	
Scottish Gaelic	Lewis	thuirt	[hʉɽʈ]	'said'	Possible realisation of /rˠ/.
Shipibo		roro	[ˈɽo̽ɽo̽]	'to break'	Apical postalveolar; possible realization of /r/.
Swedish	Some dialects	flagga	[ˈfɽagː˦˥˩ˌa˦˥˩]	'[a] flag'	Allophone of retroflexed /rd/ ([ɖ]) and (single) /l/, the former especially after labials, velars or long vowels. See Swedish phonology
Tamil		நாடு / نَاڊُ	[naːɽɯ]	'country'	Intervocalic and word-medial allophone of /ʈ/. See Tamil phonology
Telugu		గోడు	[goːɽu]	'grief'	Allophone of /ɖ/.
Tukano	Ye’pâ-Masa	petâ-de	[pɛ̀ɛ̥̀táɽɛ᷆]	'(relative to the) port'	Realisation of ⟨d⟩ in certain positions. Nasalised [ɽ͂] in nasal contexts.
Wapishana		[pɨɖaɽɨ]		'your father'	
Warlpiri		jarda	[caɽa]	'sleep'	Transcribes /ɽ/ as ⟨rd⟩.
Yele		kââdî	[kɑːɽɯ]	'sun'	Allophone of /ʈ/ between vowels.
Yidiny		[gambi:ɽ]		'tablelands'	

== Voiced retroflex nasal flap ==
Retroflex nasal flap

ɽ̃

ɳ̆

=== Features ===
Features of a retroflex nasal tap or flap:

- Its manner of articulation is tap or flap, which means it is produced with a single contraction of the muscles so that one articulator (usually the tongue) is thrown against another.
- Its place of articulation is retroflex, which prototypically means it is articulated subapical (with the tip of the tongue curled up), but more generally, it means that it is postalveolar without being palatalized. That is, besides the prototypical subapical articulation, the tongue can be apical (pointed) or, in some fricatives, laminal (flat).
- Its phonation is voiced, which means the vocal cords vibrate during the articulation.
- It is a nasal consonant, which means air is exclusively allowed to escape through the nose for nasal stops; otherwise, in addition to through the mouth.
- It is a median consonant, which means it is produced by directing the airstream down the midline of the tongue, rather than to the sides.
- Its airstream mechanism is pulmonic, which means it is articulated by pushing air only with the intercostal muscles and abdominal muscles, as in most speech sounds.

=== Occurrence ===
Language	Word	IPA	Meaning	Notes
Hindi	गणेश Gaṇeśa	[ɡəɽ̃eːʃ]	'Ganesha'	Allophone of /ɳ/ when not in clusters
Ndrumbea		[t̠áɽ̃ã́ɻ̃ẽ]	'to run'	Allophone of /ɽ/ before a nasal vowel
Kangri	न्ह़ौणा	[nɔ̌ɽ̃ɑ]	'to bathe'	Contrasts with /ɽ/.

== See also ==
- Index of phonetics articles

== Notes ==
Place →	Labial					Coronal										Dorsal					Laryngeal			
Manner ↓	Bilabial		Labiodental		Linguolabial		Dental		Alveolar		Postalveolar		Retroflex		(Alveolo-)palatal		Velar		Uvular		Pharyngeal/epiglottal		Glottal	
Nasal	m̥	m	ɱ̊	ɱ		n̼	n̪̊	n̪	n̥	n	n̠̊	n̠	ɳ̊	ɳ	ɲ̊	ɲ	ŋ̊	ŋ	ɴ̥	ɴ				
Plosive	p	b	p̪	b̪	t̼	d̼	t̪	d̪	t	d			ʈ	ɖ	c	ɟ	k	ɡ	q	ɢ	ʡ		ʔ	
Sibilant affricate							t̪s̪	d̪z̪	ts	dz	t̠ʃ	d̠ʒ	tʂ	dʐ	tɕ	dʑ								
Non-sibilant affricate	pɸ	bβ	p̪f	b̪v			t̪θ	d̪ð	tɹ̝̊	dɹ̝	t̠ɹ̠̊˔	d̠ɹ̠˔			cç	ɟʝ	kx	ɡɣ	qχ	ɢʁ	ʡʜ	ʡʢ	ʔh	
Sibilant fricative							s̪	z̪	s	z	ʃ	ʒ	ʂ	ʐ	ɕ	ʑ								
Non-sibilant fricative	ɸ	β	f	v	θ̼	ð̼	θ	ð	θ̠	ð̠	ɹ̠̊˔	ɹ̠˔	ɻ̊˔	ɻ˔	ç	ʝ	x	ɣ	χ	ʁ	ħ	ʕ	h	ɦ
Approximant		β̞		ʋ				ð̞		ɹ		ɹ̠		ɻ		j		ɰ						˷
Tap/flap		ⱱ̟		ⱱ					ɾ̥	ɾ			ɽ̊	ɽ						ɢ̆		ʡ̆		
Trill	ʙ̥	ʙ							r̥	r		r̠	ɽ̊r̥	ɽr					ʀ̥	ʀ	ʜ	ʢ		
Lateral affricate									tɬ	dɮ			tꞎ	d𝼅	c𝼆	ɟʎ̝	k𝼄	ɡʟ̝						
Lateral fricative							ɬ̪		ɬ	ɮ			ꞎ	𝼅	𝼆	ʎ̝	𝼄	ʟ̝						
Lateral approximant								l̪	l̥	l		l̠	ɭ̊	ɭ	ʎ̥	ʎ	ʟ̥	ʟ		ʟ̠				
Lateral tap/flap									ɺ̥	ɺ			𝼈̊	𝼈		ʎ̆		ʟ̆						

		BL	LD	D	A	PA	RF	P	V	U
Implosive	Voiced	ɓ			ɗ		ᶑ	ʄ	ɠ	ʛ
Implosive	Voiceless	ɓ̥			ɗ̥		ᶑ̊	ʄ̊	ɠ̊	ʛ̥
Ejective	Stop	pʼ			tʼ		ʈʼ	cʼ	kʼ	qʼ
Ejective	Affricate		p̪fʼ	tθʼ	tsʼ	tʃʼ	tʂʼ	tɕʼ	kxʼ	qχʼ
Ejective	Fricative	ɸʼ	fʼ	θʼ	sʼ	ʃʼ	ʂʼ	ɕʼ	xʼ	χʼ
Ejective	Lateral affricate				tɬʼ			c𝼆ʼ	k𝼄ʼ	q𝼄ʼ
Ejective	Lateral fricative				ɬʼ					
Click (top: velar; bottom: uvular)	Tenuis	kʘ qʘ		kǀ qǀ	kǃ qǃ		k𝼊 q𝼊	kǂ qǂ		
Click (top: velar; bottom: uvular)	Voiced	ɡʘ ɢʘ		ɡǀ ɢǀ	ɡǃ ɢǃ		ɡ𝼊 ɢ𝼊	ɡǂ ɢǂ		
Click (top: velar; bottom: uvular)	Nasal	ŋʘ ɴʘ		ŋǀ ɴǀ	ŋǃ ɴǃ		ŋ𝼊 ɴ𝼊	ŋǂ ɴǂ	ʞ	
Click (top: velar; bottom: uvular)	Tenuis lateral				kǁ qǁ					
Click (top: velar; bottom: uvular)	Voiced lateral				ɡǁ ɢǁ					
Click (top: velar; bottom: uvular)	Nasal lateral				ŋǁ ɴǁ					
