= Retroflex click =

Family of click consonants

Retroflex click type

𝼊 𝼊𐞷 ψ

Audio sample
- source · help

Encoding
- Entity (decimal): &#122634;&#968;
- Unicode (hex): U+1DF0A U+03C8
Image

Tenuis retroflex click (velar)

k𝼊 kψ

ᵏ𝼊 ᵏψ

𝼊 ψ

Voiced retroflex click (velar)

ɡ𝼊 ɡψ

ᶢ𝼊 ᶢψ

𝼊̬ ψ̬

Retroflex nasal click (velar)

ŋ𝼊 ŋψ

ᵑ𝼊 ᵑψ

𝼊̃ ψ̃

Tenuis retroflex click (uvular)

q𝼊 qψ

𐞥𝼊 𐞥ψ

Voiced retroflex click (uvular)

ɢ𝼊 ɢψ

𐞒𝼊 𐞒ψ

Retroflex nasal click (uvular)

ɴ𝼊 ɴψ

ᶰ𝼊 ᶰψ

The retroflex clicks are a family of click consonants known only from the Central ǃKung language or dialect of Namibia. They are sub-apical retroflex and should not be confused with the more widespread postalveolar clicks, which have also been called "retroflex" (for example in Unicode) due to their concave tongue shape and sometimes apical-retroflex articulation.

The 'implicit' symbol in the International Phonetic Alphabet that represents the forward articulation of these sounds is ⟨𝼊⟩. However, it has only been supported by Unicode since 2021, and usage before then is rare. In the literature, retroflex clicks have typically been written with the ad hoc digraph ⟨‼⟩, the convention since Doke identified them as retroflex in 1925. (Doke's proposed symbol, ⟨ψ⟩, did not catch on, though it has IPA support for historical transcription, nor did Vedder's and Anders' ⟨⦀⟩. For a while Amanda Miller, who noted a lateral fricated release (as had Vedder), transcribed them ⟨ǃ𐞷⟩; with the implicit IPA letter this would be ⟨𝼊𐞷⟩.)

Retroflex clicks are extraordinarily rare. True retroflex clicks occur in at least some dialects of Central ǃKung. They are reconstructed for the Proto-Kxʼa language and tentatively for Proto-Khoe–Kwadi. A nasal retroflex click is reported from Damin.

== Retroflex click consonants and their transcription ==
Basic retroflex clicks in three common transcription conventions are:

Trans. I	Trans. II	Trans. III	Description
(velar)
⟨k͜𝼊⟩	⟨ᵏ𝼊⟩	⟨𝼊⟩	tenuis retroflex click
⟨k͜𝼊ʰ⟩	⟨ᵏ𝼊ʰ⟩	⟨𝼊ʰ⟩	aspirated retroflex click
⟨ɡ͜𝼊⟩	⟨ᶢ𝼊⟩	⟨𝼊̬⟩	voiced retroflex click
⟨ŋ͜𝼊⟩	⟨ᵑ𝼊⟩	⟨𝼊̬̃⟩	retroflex nasal click
⟨ŋ̊͜𝼊ʰʰ⟩	⟨ᵑ̥𝼊ʰʰ⟩	⟨𝼊̃ʰʰ⟩	aspirated retroflex nasal click
⟨ŋ͜𝼊ˀ⟩	⟨ᵑ𝼊ˀ⟩	⟨𝼊̃ˀ⟩	glottalized retroflex nasal click
(uvular)
⟨q͜𝼊⟩	⟨𐞥𝼊⟩	⟨𝼊̴⟩	tenuis retroflex click
⟨q͜𝼊ʰ⟩	⟨𐞥𝼊ʰ⟩	⟨𝼊̴ʰ⟩	aspirated retroflex click
⟨ɢ͜𝼊⟩	⟨𐞒𝼊⟩	⟨𝼊̴̬⟩	voiced retroflex click
⟨ɴ͜𝼊⟩	⟨ᶰ𝼊⟩	⟨𝼊̴̬̃⟩	retroflex nasal click
⟨ɴ̥͜𝼊ʰʰ⟩	⟨ᶰ̥𝼊ʰʰ⟩	⟨𝼊̴̃ʰʰ⟩	aspirated retroflex nasal click
⟨ɴ͜𝼊ˀ⟩	⟨ᶰ𝼊ˀ⟩	⟨𝼊̴̃ˀ⟩	glottalized retroflex nasal click

== Features ==
Features of retroflex clicks:

- The basic articulation may be voiced, nasal, aspirated, glottalized, etc.
- The place of articulation is postalveolar and subapical, meaning the tip of the tongue is curled up to contact the roof of the mouth in the area behind the alveolar ridge (the gum line). The center of the tongue moves downward to create suction.
- Clicks may be oral or nasal, which means that the airflow is either restricted to the mouth, or passes through the nose as well.
- It is a lateral consonant, which means it is produced by directing the airstream over the sides of the tongue, rather than down the middle.
- The airstream mechanism is lingual ingressive (also known as velaric ingressive), which means a pocket of air trapped between two closures is rarefied by a "sucking" action of the tongue, rather than being moved by the glottis or the lungs/diaphragm. The release of the forward closure produces the "click" sound. Voiced and nasal clicks have a simultaneous pulmonic egressive airstream.

== Occurrence ==
As with other click articulations, retroflex clicks may be produced with various manners. An example is the voiced retroflex click in the Grootfontein ǃKung (Central Juu) word for 'water', [ᶢ𝼊𐞷ú] (g‼ú).

Damin is the only other language known to have had such a sound, though only the nasal click occurred. It occurred as both a single and a doubled consonant, which was articulated twice. It was apico-domal, and no comparison was ever done with the Central Juu articulation.

A retroflex series claimed for Ekoka ǃKung turns out to be domed palatal clicks.

== See also ==
- The fricated palatal click of Ekoka ǃKung, which was once thought to be retroflex
- Alveolar click
- Bilabial click
- Dental click
- Lateral click
- Palatal click

== Notes and references ==
Place →	Labial					Coronal										Dorsal					Laryngeal			
Manner ↓	Bilabial		Labiodental		Linguolabial		Dental		Alveolar		Postalveolar		Retroflex		(Alveolo-)palatal		Velar		Uvular		Pharyngeal/epiglottal		Glottal	
Nasal	m̥	m	ɱ̊	ɱ		n̼	n̪̊	n̪	n̥	n	n̠̊	n̠	ɳ̊	ɳ	ɲ̊	ɲ	ŋ̊	ŋ	ɴ̥	ɴ				
Plosive	p	b	p̪	b̪	t̼	d̼	t̪	d̪	t	d			ʈ	ɖ	c	ɟ	k	ɡ	q	ɢ	ʡ		ʔ	
Sibilant affricate							t̪s̪	d̪z̪	ts	dz	t̠ʃ	d̠ʒ	tʂ	dʐ	tɕ	dʑ								
Non-sibilant affricate	pɸ	bβ	p̪f	b̪v			t̪θ	d̪ð	tɹ̝̊	dɹ̝	t̠ɹ̠̊˔	d̠ɹ̠˔			cç	ɟʝ	kx	ɡɣ	qχ	ɢʁ	ʡʜ	ʡʢ	ʔh	
Sibilant fricative							s̪	z̪	s	z	ʃ	ʒ	ʂ	ʐ	ɕ	ʑ								
Non-sibilant fricative	ɸ	β	f	v	θ̼	ð̼	θ	ð	θ̠	ð̠	ɹ̠̊˔	ɹ̠˔	ɻ̊˔	ɻ˔	ç	ʝ	x	ɣ	χ	ʁ	ħ	ʕ	h	ɦ
Approximant		β̞		ʋ				ð̞		ɹ		ɹ̠		ɻ		j		ɰ						˷
Tap/flap		ⱱ̟		ⱱ					ɾ̥	ɾ			ɽ̊	ɽ						ɢ̆		ʡ̆		
Trill	ʙ̥	ʙ							r̥	r		r̠	ɽ̊r̥	ɽr					ʀ̥	ʀ	ʜ	ʢ		
Lateral affricate									tɬ	dɮ			tꞎ	d𝼅	c𝼆	ɟʎ̝	k𝼄	ɡʟ̝						
Lateral fricative							ɬ̪		ɬ	ɮ			ꞎ	𝼅	𝼆	ʎ̝	𝼄	ʟ̝						
Lateral approximant								l̪	l̥	l		l̠	ɭ̊	ɭ	ʎ̥	ʎ	ʟ̥	ʟ		ʟ̠				
Lateral tap/flap									ɺ̥	ɺ			𝼈̊	𝼈		ʎ̆		ʟ̆						

		BL	LD	D	A	PA	RF	P	V	U
Implosive	Voiced	ɓ			ɗ		ᶑ	ʄ	ɠ	ʛ
Implosive	Voiceless	ɓ̥			ɗ̥		ᶑ̊	ʄ̊	ɠ̊	ʛ̥
Ejective	Stop	pʼ			tʼ		ʈʼ	cʼ	kʼ	qʼ
Ejective	Affricate		p̪fʼ	tθʼ	tsʼ	tʃʼ	tʂʼ	tɕʼ	kxʼ	qχʼ
Ejective	Fricative	ɸʼ	fʼ	θʼ	sʼ	ʃʼ	ʂʼ	ɕʼ	xʼ	χʼ
Ejective	Lateral affricate				tɬʼ			c𝼆ʼ	k𝼄ʼ	q𝼄ʼ
Ejective	Lateral fricative				ɬʼ					
Click (top: velar; bottom: uvular)	Tenuis	kʘ qʘ		kǀ qǀ	kǃ qǃ		k𝼊 q𝼊	kǂ qǂ		
Click (top: velar; bottom: uvular)	Voiced	ɡʘ ɢʘ		ɡǀ ɢǀ	ɡǃ ɢǃ		ɡ𝼊 ɢ𝼊	ɡǂ ɢǂ		
Click (top: velar; bottom: uvular)	Nasal	ŋʘ ɴʘ		ŋǀ ɴǀ	ŋǃ ɴǃ		ŋ𝼊 ɴ𝼊	ŋǂ ɴǂ	ʞ	
Click (top: velar; bottom: uvular)	Tenuis lateral				kǁ qǁ					
Click (top: velar; bottom: uvular)	Voiced lateral				ɡǁ ɢǁ					
Click (top: velar; bottom: uvular)	Nasal lateral				ŋǁ ɴǁ					
