= Click letter =

Letter representing a click sound

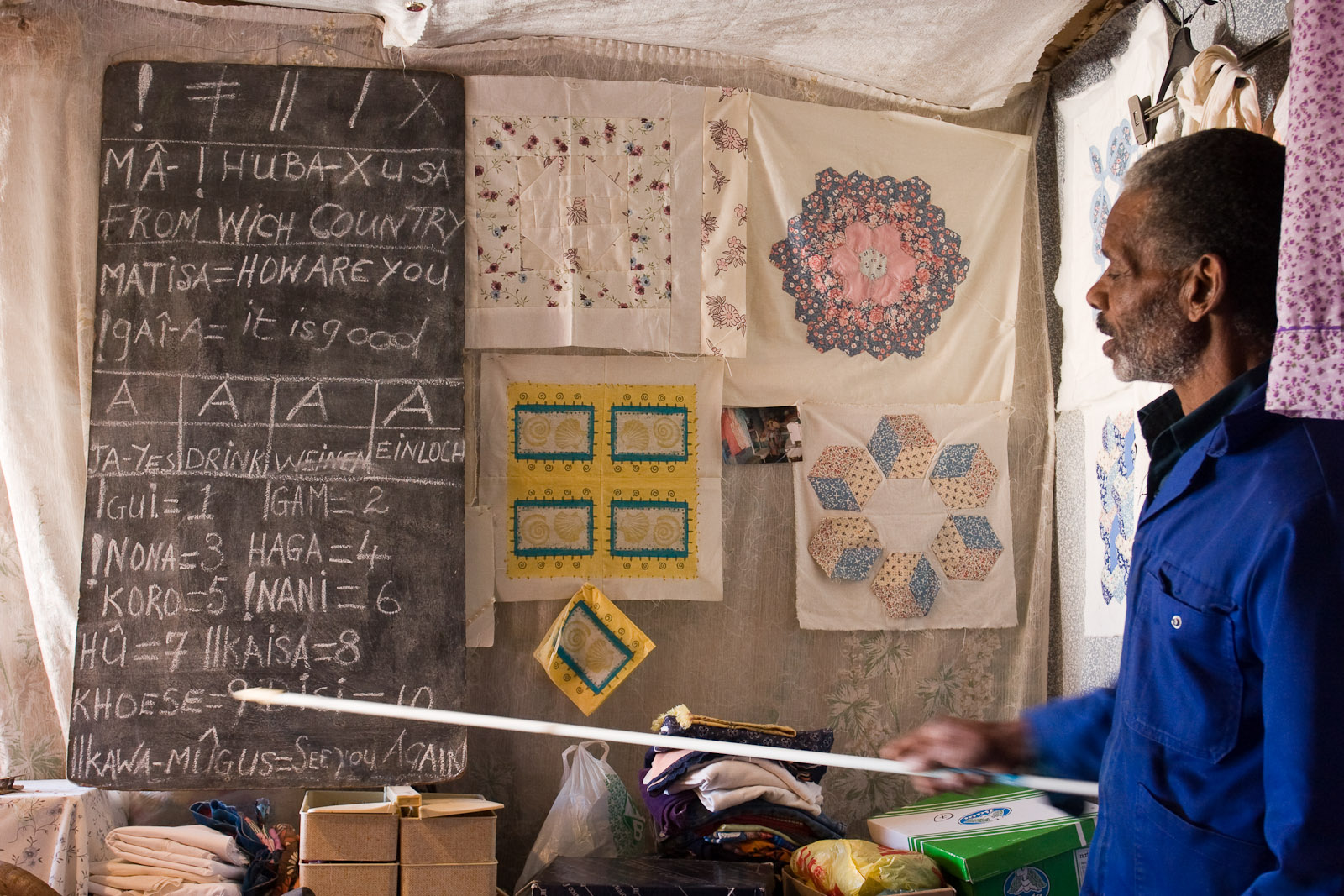
A Nama man giving a literacy lesson in Khoekhoegowab that includes click letters

Various letters have been used to write the click consonants of southern Africa. The precursors of the current IPA letters, ⟨ǀ⟩ ⟨ǁ⟩ ⟨ǃ⟩ ⟨ǂ⟩, were created by Karl Richard Lepsius and used by Wilhelm Bleek and Lucy Lloyd, who added ⟨ʘ⟩. Also influential was Daniel Jones, who promoted the letters ⟨ʇ⟩ ⟨ʖ⟩ ⟨ʗ⟩ ⟨ʞ⟩ that were part of the IPA from 1921 to 1989, and were used by Clement Doke and Douglas Beach.

Individual languages have had various orthographies, usually based on either the Lepsius alphabet or on the Latin alphabet. They may change over time or between countries. Latin letters, such as ⟨c⟩ ⟨x⟩ ⟨q⟩ ⟨ç⟩, have case forms; the pipe letters ⟨ǀ⟩ ⟨ǁ⟩ ⟨ǃ⟩ ⟨ǂ⟩ do not. (Note: The original Lepsius pipe letters actually did have case forms. For example, Lepsius (1855, p. 49) wrote Amaxhosa and Xhosa as Amaııósa and 𝖨𝖨ósa.)

== Multiple systems ==
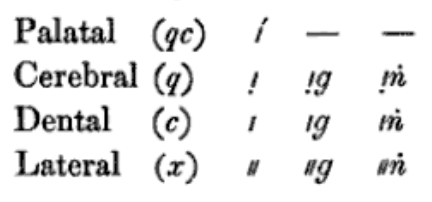
The clicks of Xhosa, in the Lepsius alphabet of 1854. The ⟨ṅ⟩ is equivalent to ⟨ŋ⟩. The pipe with the acute accent was soon replaced with ⟨ǂ⟩.

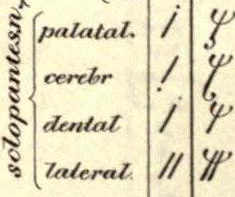
The click letters created by Carl Jakob Sundevall in 1855 (right column), along with the corresponding Lepsius letters (center).

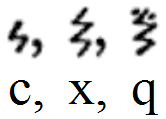
By the early 19th century, the otherwise unneeded letters ⟨c⟩ ⟨x⟩ ⟨q⟩ were used as the basis for writing clicks in Zulu by British and German missions. (Note: Zulu click letters of the Norwegian mission The Norwegian mission to the Zulu used ⟨ϟ⟩ (a z-like zig-zag) for c (perhaps related to the use of both z and c for dental affricates), a double ⟨ϟ⟩ (a ξ-like qoppa zigzag) for x (perhaps not coincidentally, Greek ξ is transcribed x), and the same letter with an umlaut for q.) However, for general linguistic transcription this was confusing, as each of these letters had other uses. There were various ad hoc attempts to create dedicated letters—often iconic symbols—for click consonants, with the most successful being those of the Standard Alphabet by Lepsius, which were based on a single symbol (pipe, double pipe, pipe-acute, pipe-sub-dot) and from which the modern Khoekhoe letters ⟨ǀ⟩ ⟨ǁ⟩ ⟨ǃ⟩ ⟨ǂ⟩ descend.

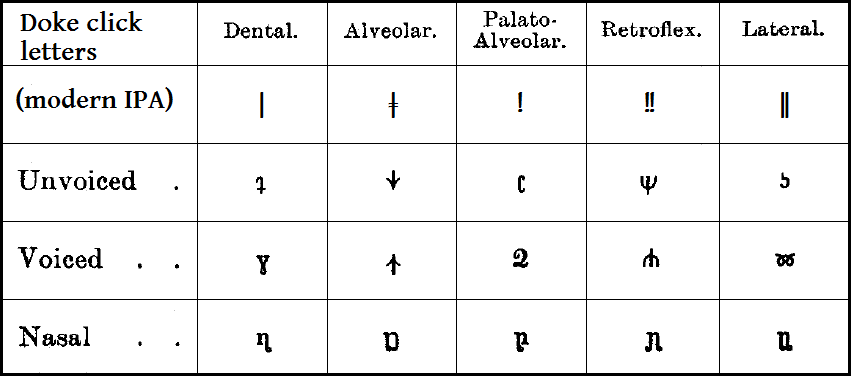
The 1925 Doke orthography for ʗhũ̬ː (ǃXũ). Note that "alveolar" (2nd column) and "palato-alveolar" (3rd column) correspond to modern palatal [ǂ] and alveolar [ǃ], as can be confirmed with the rendition of the language ǃXũ as ⟨ʗhũ̬ː⟩. The letters in the first, third and fifth columns had earlier been used for Zulu. The voiced dental click has the letter ⟨ɣ⟩ that would later be used by the IPA for a voiced velar fricative. Though not clear from this image, the descenders on the nasal clicks that bend to the right bear rings, while those that bend to the left are tails as in IPA ŋ and ɲ. That is, the nasal click letters are, respectively, n with a ring on the right leg, ŋ with a ring on the left leg, n with a ring on the left leg, ɲ with a ring on the right leg, and n with rings on both legs, or, in the order of the main table,.

During the First World War, Daniel Jones adopted the equivalent letters ⟨ʇ⟩ ⟨ʖ⟩ ⟨ʗ⟩ ⟨ʞ⟩ in response to a 1914 call to fill this gap in the IPA, and these were published in 1921; they were formally accepted by the IPA in 1928 (see §§ 1921 chart and 1928 revisions).

In 1875, if not earlier, Wilhelm Bleek created or adopted the letter ⟨ʘ⟩ for bilabial clicks. It would be used more extensively by Lucy Lloyd in 1911 and added to the IPA in 1976.

Clement Doke expanded on Jones' letters in 1923. Based on an empirically informed conception of the nature of click consonants, he analyzed voiced and nasal clicks as separate consonants, much as the voiced plosives [b d ɡ] and nasals [m n ŋ] are considered separate consonants from the voiceless plosives [p t k], and so he created letters for voiced and nasal clicks. (Like other researchers, Doke did not use the palatal click letter from the IPA. Jones had called it "velar", and people took it as having that value rather than its intended one.) Doke was the first to report retroflex clicks, and created letters for them as well.

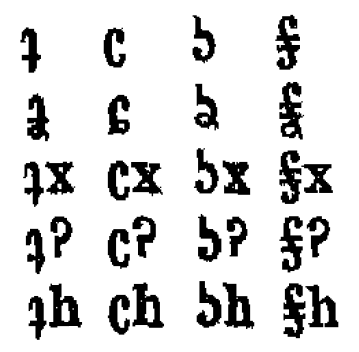
The clicks of Khoekhoe in the Beach alphabet of 1938. The columns are (left to right) dental, alveolar, lateral and palatal. In modern orthography, the rows are Ʞg Ʞn Ʞkh Ʞ Ʞh, where Ʞ is used to represent any click letter (any column).

Douglas Beach would publish a somewhat similar system in his phonetic description of Khoekhoe. Because Khoekhoe had no voiced clicks, he only created new letters for the four nasal clicks. Like Doke, he didn't use Jones' "velar" click letter, but created one of his own, ⟨𝼋⟩, based on the Lepsius letter ⟨ǂ⟩ modified to better fit the design of the IPA.

Letters for click types
		bilabial	dental	alveolar	lateral	palatal	retroflex	
Wuras ms		8	∧	∩	⨅	⅂		
Boyce (1834)			c	q	x	qc (Note: Identified by Lepsius as equivalent to his ⟨ǀ́⟩)		
Knudsen (1846)			ꞏ	ʻ	ʼ	꞉		
Schreuder (1850)			ϟ	ϟ̈͛	ϟ͛			
Lepsius (1853)			ǀc	ǀʞ	ǀx	ǀɔ		
Lepsius (1854) (Note: The Lepsius letter is a short vertical pipe, with neither ascender nor descender—that is, of the same height as the letter ⟨n⟩, similar to ⟨ı⟩—nor serifs. In Krönlein's work, it has a short ascender, giving it the height of a capital or the lowercase letter ⟨t⟩; moreover in Krönlein, the four pipe letters are always inclined, like the letters in italic and oblique type. Bleek 1875 and Lloyd 1911 also used capital-height letters, so they would harmonize with titles and other all-capital text, but kept them upright except in italic text.)			ǀ	ǀ̣	ǁ	ǀ́ (Note: The double-barred pipe was proposed by the Rhenish Mission Conference in 1856 and quickly replaced Lepsius's pipe with acute accent. Sundevall (1855/56) displays the letter as ⟨ǀ̇⟩.)		
Sundevall (1855/56)	capital							
Sundevall (1855/56)	lowercase							
Bleek (1857)			c	q	x	ɔ		
Tindall (1858) (Note: Tindall's full paradigm is: c ch ck cg ckh cn q qh qk qg qkh qn x xh xk xg xkh xn v vh vk vg vkh vn)			c	q	x	v		
Palaeotype (1869)			5	↊	7	4		
Anthropos (1907)		p (Note: In the Anthropos journal turned p is distinguishable from d by the difference in the top serifs, the shape of the bowl and the bottom terminal in the italic font used.)	ʇ̯	ʇ	ʇ̪ (or ʇ̰)	ɔ	ʇ̣	+velar ʞ
Nigmann (1909)			ζ	χ	γ			
Lloyd (1911)		ʘ	ǀ	ǃ	ǁ	ǂ		
Johnston (1913/19)			ʖ or c̓	_{ʕ} or q̓ (Note: The letters for the 'palatal' (i.e. alveolar) and lateral clicks have descenders, analogous to ⟨q⟩ and unlike the glottal stop letter, while those for the dental and lateral clicks have ascenders.)	_{ʔ} or x̓	ʖ or q̓c̓		
Jones (1921)			ʇ	ʗ	ʖ	ʞ ('velar')		
Doke (1925)	tenuis		ʇ	ʗ	ʖ	🡣	ψ (Note: In Doke's publications there is no ascender on the middle stroke, as in some sans-serif ('grotesk') fonts like the Arial font.)	
Doke (1925)	voiced		ɣ (Note: Bleek (1923:73) renders the letter as a baby gamma ⟨⟩. ⟨ɣ⟩ for the voiced velar fricative was not yet in the IPA; it was first used by Jones in 1928.)	𝒬	➿︎	🡡	ψ	
Doke (1925)	nasal							
Engelbrecht (1928)			c	q	x	ç		
Tucker (1929)		ʘ	ʇ	ʗ	ʖ	ʇ̵		
Beach (1938)	oral		ʇ	ʗ	ʖ	𝼋		
Beach (1938)	nasal		𝼍	𝼏	𝼎	𝼌		
Pienaar (1938)		ʘ	ǀ	ǃ	ǁ	ǂ	⦀	
Smalley (1963)	tenuis	p^{←} (Note: The diacritic in Smalley is actually a superscript leftward arrow, but it is not supported by Unicode.)	ṱ^{←}	t^{←}	tȽ^{←}	c^{←}	ṭ^{←}	
Smalley (1963)	voiced	b^{←}	ḓ^{←}	d^{←}	dȽ^{←}	j^{←}	ḍ^{←}	
Smalley (1963)	nasal	m^{←}	ṋ^{←}	n^{←}	nȽ^{←}	ñ^{←}	ṇ^{←}	
UPSID (1981–1984)	Khoekhoe		ʇ̪ˢ	ʇ	ʖ𐞛	ʇ̠ (Note: Identified as palato-alveolar.)		
UPSID (1981–1984)	ǃKung		ʇ̪ˢ	ʇ	ʗ𐞠 (Note: Identified as palatal lateral. UPSID distinguishes affricated from abrupt clicks by adding a superscript fricative letter. The dedicated extIPA letter ⟨𝼆⟩ was not yet available.)	ʗ		
UPSID (1981–1984)	Zulu		ʇˢ	ʇ̠	ʖ𐞛			
ARA proposal (1982)		ω	ʈ	ɖ	λ	ç		
Matte & Omark (1984)		ɋ	ʇ	ʗ	ʖ	𝼋		
Current IPA (1989)		ʘ	ǀ	ǃ	ǁ	ǂ	𝼊 (Note: The letter ⟨𝼊⟩ (ǃ̢) is 'implicit' in the IPA but is not included in the summary IPA chart. It is uncommon, and ad hoc ⟨‼⟩ is often used in the literature.)	
Substitutions
Typewriter substitutions		@	/	!	//	= or ≠ (Note: On a typewriter, ≠ can be composed by overlaying a slash over an equal sign.)	!!	
Hales & Nash (1997; nasal)		m!	nh!	n!		(ny!)	rn!	
Linguasphere (1999)		p'	c'	q'	l'	t'		
Lingvarium (ca. 2005)		пъ	цъ	къ	лъ	чъ		
Other writing systems
Mwangwego (by 1997)								
Ditema script (2014)								
N'ko script (2015) (Note: As N'ko click letters are not supported by Unicode as of 2025, here they are substituted with Arabic diacritical dots, combined above the Arabic tatweel joiner (U+0640). In actual N'ko, they are each a connecting horizontal stroke with similar dots above.)		ــ﮲	ــ﮽	ــ﮴	ــ﮶	ــ﮸		
Luo (Botswana, post-2012)								

The African reference alphabet proposal has apparently never been used, while the Linguasphere and Lingvarium transcriptions are typewriter substitutions specific to those institutions. (Note: Linguasphere found the Khoisanist/IPA letters to be impractical for sorting and with their database, and so substituted them with p', c', q', l', t'. These occur with the usual accompaniments, for sequences such as L'xegwi, Nc'hu, C'qwi, and Q'xung. Lingvarium did something similar for Cyrillic.)

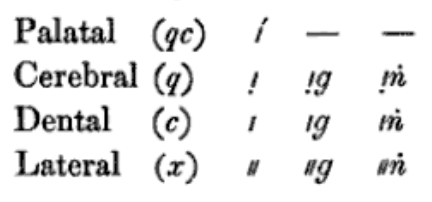
Besides the difference in letter shape (variations on a pipe for Lepsius, modifications of Latin letters for Jones), there was a conceptual difference between them and Doke or Beach: Lepsius used one letter as the base for all click consonants of the same place of articulation (called the 'influx'), and added a second letter or diacritic for the manner of articulation (called the 'efflux'), treating them as two distinct sounds (the click proper and its accompaniment), (Note: Lepsius explained his system as follows: Essential to the [clicks] is the peculiarity of stopping in part, and even drawing back the breath, which appears to be most easily expressed by a simple bar 𝗅. If we connect with this our common marks for the cerebral [i.e. retroflex: the sub-dot] or the palatal [i.e. the acute accent], a peculiar notation is wanted only for the lateral, which is the strongest sound. We propose to express it by two bars 𝗅𝗅. As the gutturals [i.e. posterior articulations] evidently do not unite with the clicks into one sound, but form a compound sound, we may make them simply to follow, as with the diphthongs. — Lepsius (1863:80–81)) whereas Doke used a separate letter for each tenuis, voiced, and nasal click, treating each as a distinct consonant, following the example of the Latin alphabet, where the voiced and nasal occlusives also treated as distinct consonants (p b m, t d n, c j ñ, k g ŋ).

Doke's nasal-click letters were based on the letter ⟨n⟩, continuing the pattern of the pulmonic nasal consonants ⟨m ɱ n ɲ ɳ ŋ ɴ⟩. For example, the letters for the palatal and retroflex clicks are ⟨ŋ⟩ ⟨ɲ⟩ with a curl on their free leg: ⟨⟩ ⟨⟩. The voiced-click letters are more individuated, a couple were simply inverted versions of the tenuis-click letters. The tenuis–voiced pairs were dental ⟨ʇ ɣ⟩ (the letter ⟨ɣ⟩ had not yet been added to the IPA for the voiced velar fricative), alveolar ⟨ʗ 𝒬⟩, retroflex ⟨ψ ψ⟩, palatal ⟨⟩ and lateral ⟨ʖ ➿︎⟩. A proposal to add Doke's letters to Unicode was not approved.

The Nama name ǁhapopen ǀoas (ʖhapopen ʇʔoas), from Beach's phonology.

The Khoekhoe word ǂgaeǂui (𝼋ae-𝼋ʔui), illustrating Beach's distinctive form of the letter ǂ.

The Khoekhoe word ǁnau (𝼎au), illustrating the curled tail Beach used to indicate nasal clicks.

Beach wrote on Khoekhoe and so had no need for letters for the voiced clicks; he created letters for nasal clicks by adding a curl to the bottom of the tenuis-click letters: ⟨𝼌 𝼏 𝼍 𝼎⟩.

Doke and Beach both wrote aspirated clicks with an h, ⟨ʇh ʗh ʖh 𝼋h⟩, and the glottalized nasal clicks as an oral click with a glottal stop, ⟨ʇʔ ʗʔ ʖʔ 𝼋ʔ⟩. Beach also wrote the affricate contour clicks with an x, ⟨ʇx ʗx ʖx 𝼋x⟩.

The only other scripts to have letters for clicks are N'ko in Mali and Luo script in Botswana, which include them for paralexical use, and the experimental Ditema tsa Dinoko script, which uses them lexically.

== Transcription practices ==
Doke had run foundational experiments establishing the nature of click consonants as unitary sounds. Nonetheless, Bleek in his highly influential work on Bushman languages rejected Doke's orthography on theoretical grounds, arguing that each of Doke's letters stood for two sounds, "a combination of the implosive sound with the sound made by the expulsion of the breath" (that is, influx plus efflux), and that it was impossible to write the clicks themselves in Doke's orthography, as "we cannot call [the implosive sounds] either unvoiced, voiced, or nasal." Bleek therefore used digraphs based on the Lepsius letters, as Lepsius himself had done for the same reason. However, linguists have since come down on the side of Doke and take the two places of articulation to be inherent in the nature of clicks, because both are required to create a click: the 'influx' cannot exist without the 'efflux', so a symbol for an influx has only theoretical meaning just as a symbol like ⟨D⟩ for 'alveolar consonant' does not indicate any actual consonant. Regardless, differentiated consonant letters like Doke's and Beach's were never provided by the IPA, and today linguists continue to resort to digraphs or diacritics in a way that is not used for non-click consonants. (For example, no-one transcribes an alveolar nasal stop [n] as either ⟨ⁿt⟩ or ⟨t̃⟩, analogous to the way one writes a dental nasal click as ⟨ⁿǀ⟩ or ⟨ǀ̃⟩, or in the older tradition as ⟨ⁿʇ⟩ or ⟨ʇ̃⟩.)

Summarized below are the common means of representing voicing, nasalization and dorsal place of articulation, from Bleek's digraphs reflecting an analysis as co-articulated consonants, to those same letters written as superscripts to function as diacritics, reflecting an analysis as unitary consonants, to the combining diacritics for voicing and nasalization. Because the last option does not indicate the posterior place of articulation, it does not directly distinguish velar from uvular clicks. However, the IPA guttural diacritic could be used for the more guttural uvular series. The letter ⟨Ʞ⟩ is used here as a wildcard for any click letter.

	Velar			Uvular		
	Tenuis	Voiced	Nasal	Tenuis	Voiced	Nasal
Coarticulation analysis	k͜Ʞ	ɡ͜Ʞ	ŋ͜Ʞ	q͜Ʞ	ɢ͜Ʞ	ɴ͜Ʞ
Superscript diacritics, unitary analysis	ᵏꞰ	ᶢꞰ	ᵑꞰ	𐞥Ʞ	𐞒Ʞ	ᶰꞰ
Combining diacritics, unitary analysis	Ʞ	Ʞ̬	Ʞ̬̃	Ʞ̴	Ʞ̴̬	Ʞ̴̬̃

A distinction may be made between ⟨ᵏꞰ⟩ for an inaudible rear articulation, ⟨Ʞᵏ⟩ for an audible one, and ⟨Ʞ͜k⟩ for a notably delayed release of the rear articulation; for aspirated clicks these are ⟨ᵏꞰʰ⟩, ⟨Ʞᵏʰ⟩, ⟨Ʞ͜kʰ⟩.

In the older literature, voicing is commonly marked by a wavy diacritic under the click letter, thus: ⟨ʘ᪶ ǀ᪶ ǃ᪶ ǁ᪶ ǂ᪶⟩.

== Historical orthographies ==
Written languages with clicks generally use an alphabet either based on the Lepsius alphabet, with multigraphs based on the pipe letters for clicks, or on the Zulu alphabet, with multigraphs based on c q x for clicks. In the latter case, there have been several conventions for the palatal clicks. Some languages have had more than one orthography over the years. For example, Khoekhoe has had at least the following, using dental clicks as an example:

Khoekhoe orthographies (illustrated with dental clicks)
Modern	ǀguis	ǀa	ǀham	ǀnu
Beach (1938)	ʇuis	ʇʔa	ʇham	𝼍u
Tindall (1858)	cguis	ca	cham	cnu

Historical roman orthographies have been based on the following sets of letters:

Latin letters for tenuis clicks
	dental	alveolar	lateral	palatal
Xhosa (1834)	c	q	x	qc (Note: reported from a few words, not used in modern publication)
Khoekhoe (1858)	c	q	x	v
Juǀʼhoan (1987–1994)	c	q	x	ç
Naro (2001–present)	c	q	x	tc (Note: a typewriter-friendly variant of the Juǀʼhoan convention of ç, which had initially been used for Naro as well.)

There are two principal conventions for writing the manners of articulation (the 'effluxes'), which are used with both the Lepsius and Zulu orthographies. One uses g for voicing and x for affricate clicks; the other uses d for voicing and g for affricate clicks. Both use n for nasal clicks, but these letters may come either before or after the base letter. For simplicity, these will be illustrated across various orthographies using the lateral clicks only.

Conventions for click manners (illustrated on lateral clicks)
		tenuis	voiced	nasal	glottalized	aspirated	affricated	affricated ejective	voiceless nasal	murmured	murmured nasal
Zulu	> ca. 1850	x	xg (Note: slack voiced)	xn		xh					
Khoekhoe	modern	ǁg		ǁn	ǁ		ǁkh		ǁh		
Khoekhoe	1858	xg (Note: As well as possible ⟨xk⟩, which is conflated with xg in the modern language)		xn	x		xkh		xh		
Naro	> 2001	x	dx	nx	xʼ	xh	xg	xgʼ			
Juǀʼhoan	modern	ǁ	gǁ	nǁ	ǁʼ	ǁh	ǁx, gǁx	ǁk, gǁk	ǁʼh	gǁh	nǁh
Juǀʼhoan	1975	ǁ	gǁ	nǁ	ǁʼ	ǁh	ǁx, gǁx	ǁxʼ, gǁxʼ	ǁʼh	gǁh	nǁʼh
Juǀʼhoan	1987	x	dx	nx	xʼ	xh	xg, dxg	xgʼ, dxgʼ	xʼh	dxh	nxh
Hadza		x (Note: Or ⟨gx⟩ when preceded by ⟨n⟩, in which position it tends to be voiced.)		nx	xx	xh					
Sandawe		x	gx	nx	xʼ	xh					

== Gallery ==
The following systems are presented in the same order: bilabial ('ɋ'), dental ('c'), lateral ('x'), alveolar ('q'), palatal ('v') and retroflex ('‼'), with gaps for missing letters.

The Zulu click letters of the Norwegian mission:

c

x

q

Lepsius's click letters (lower case; upper case are taller):

c

x

q

v

Sundevall's capital click letters:

c

x

q

v

Sundevall's lowercase click letters:

c

x

q

v

Bleek's and Lloyd's proportions:

ɋ

c

x

q

v

Jones's IPA letters:

c

x

q

v

Doke's letters for voiceless clicks:

c

x

q

v

‼

Doke's letters for voiced clicks:

gc

gx

gq

gv

g‼

gc (variant)

gx (variant)

Doke's letters for nasal clicks:

nc

nx

nq

nv

n‼

(To fit later IPA conventions, would be used for the palatal and for the retroflex.)

Tucker's letters:

c

x

q

v

(To write nasal clicks, these take a combining tilde above.)

Beach's letters for voiceless clicks:

c

x

q

v

Beach's letters for nasal clicks:

nc

nx

nq

nv

Matte & Omark click letters:

ɋ

c

x

q

v

Post-Kiel IPA (baseline, e.g. 1989):

ɋ

c

x

q

v

‼

(⟨𝼊⟩ was "implied" by the IPA and would be officially supported later.)

Post-Kiel IPA (with descenders, e.g. 2020):

ɋ

c

x

q

v

‼

Mwangwego akshara (with inherent /a/):

xa

qa

Ditema syllabics letters:

ɋh

ch

xh

qh

vh

Nko phonetic letters:

ɋ

c

x

q

v
