= Central ǃKung =

ǃKung variety of Namibia

- Central ǃXun
- Native to: Namibia
- Region: Grootfontein
- Language family: Kxʼa: ǃKung; Central ǃKung
- Dialects: Grootfontein ǃXuun

Language codes
- ISO 639-3: None (mis)
- Glottolog: cent2300

Central ǃKung (Central ǃXun), or Central Ju, is a language of the ǃKung dialect cluster, spoken in a small area of northern Namibia: Neitsas, in Grootfontein district, and Gaub, in Tsumeb district. It is frequently identified as Grootfontein ǃXuun, as most research has been done in Grootfontein. An identifying feature of Central ǃKung is a fifth series of clicks that are often retroflex. While Northern (Northwestern) and Southern (Southeastern) ǃKung are not mutually intelligible, it is not yet clear to what extent Central ǃKung is intermediate between them or intelligible with either.

== Dialects ==
Two dialects are identified as being Central ǃKung based on grammatical features:

- Central ǃKung
  - (C1) Gaub (Tsumeb district, N Namibia)
  - (C2) Neitsas (Grootfontein district, N Namibia)

In addition, the ǃKung dialects of Tsintsabis, Leeunes and Mangetti (different from Mangetti Dune) have retroflex clicks and so may belong here, though no grammatical information is available to classify them.

In Grootfontein ǃKung words which Doke (1926) and others have described as having retroflex clicks, Vedder (1910/1911) described a second series of lateral clicks in Gaub ǃKung. The retroflex clicks have also been reported as having a lateral release.

== Phonology ==
Grootfontein ǃKung is unusual in having true retroflex clicks, which are subapical for some speakers and have lateral release, as in the word for 'water', [ᶢ𝼊𐞷ú] (provisionally written g‼ú). There are thus five places of articulation in Grootfontein clicks, /ǃ ǀ ǁ ǂ 𝼊 /. These come in eight series, here represented with the retroflex articulation:

Lingual /𝼊 𝼊ʰ ᶢ𝼊 ᵑ𝼊 ᵑ̊𝼊ʰ/, glottalized /ᵑ̊𝼊ˀ/, linguo-pulmonic /𝼊χ/, linguo-glottalic /𝼊͡kxʼ/

Otherwise, the Grootfontein inventory is similar to that of Ekoka ǃKung, except that it lacks the (pre)voiced affricates /dχ, dʒ, dʒʼ, dʃχʼ/.

The Grootfontein ǃKung language has a relatively large phonological inventory:

=== Consonants ===
Grootfontein ǃKung consonant inventory
		Labial	Alveolar	Post- alveolar	Palatal	Velar	Uvular	Glottal
Nasal	voiced	m	n		ɲ	ŋ		
Nasal	aspirated	mʰ	nʰ					
Plosive	voiceless	p	t			k		ʔ
Plosive	vl. aspirated	pʰ		t̠ʰ		kʰ		
Plosive	voiced	b	d			ɡ		
Plosive	vd. aspirated	bʰ	dʰ			ɡʰ		
Plosive	prenasal	(ᵐb)	(ⁿd)			(ᵑɡ)		
Fricative				ʃ			χ	ɦ
Affricate	voiceless			tʃ				
Affricate	aspirated			tʃʰ				
Affricate	ejective			tʃʼ				
Approximant		w	l		j			
Clusters
Plain + /χ/			tχ	tʃχ				
Plain + /χʼ/						kχʼ		

Grootfontein ǃKung click consonant inventory
	Dental	Alveolar	Retroflex	Palatal	Lateral
Voiceless	ǀ	ǃ	𝼊	ǂ	ǁ
Vl. aspirated	ǀʰ	ǃʰ	𝼊ʰ	ǂʰ	ǁʰ
Voiced	ᶢǀ	ᶢǃ	ᶢ𝼊	ᶢǂ	ᶢǁ
Vd. aspirated	ᶢǀʰ	ᶢǃʰ	ᶢ𝼊ʰ	ᶢǂʰ	ᶢǁʰ
Nasal	ᵑǀ	ᵑǃ	ᵑ𝼊	ᵑǂ	ᵑǁ
Nl. aspirated	ᵑǀʰ	ᵑǃʰ	ᵑ𝼊ʰ	ᵑǂʰ	ᵑǁʰ
Fortis		ᵏǃ			ᵏǁ
Ejective	ǀʼ	ǃʼ	𝼊ʼ	ǂʼ	ǁʼ
Ej. aspirated	ǀʼʰ	ǃʼʰ	𝼊ʼʰ	ǂʼʰ	ǁʼʰ
Clusters
Plain + /χ/	ǀχ	ǃχ	𝼊χ	ǂχ	ǁχ
Plain + /χʼ/	ǀχʼ	ǃχʼ	𝼊χʼ	ǂχʼ	ǁχʼ
Voiced + /χʼ/	ᶢǀχʼ	ᶢǃχʼ	ᶢ𝼊χʼ	ᶢǂχʼ	ᶢǁχʼ

=== Vowels ===
Five vowel sounds in the ǃKung languages are realized as [i e a o u]. The sounds may be articulated with nasalisation [ĩ ẽ ã õ ũ], breathy voice [iʱ eʱ aʱ oʱ uʱ], or pharyngealisation [iˤ eˤ aˤ oˤ uˤ]. Some nasal vowels with diacritics may have combinations such as breathy + nasal [ãʱ õʱ], and pharyngeal + nasal [ãˤ õˤ ũˤ].

== Sample texts ==
Following are sample sentences in Central ǃKung.

mí má kȍhà hŋ́ gǀȕì ō ǁȁhìn-ā ō hȁ ō gǀè gù ǀxūúnnu
1SG TOP MIR see hyena PURP tell-TR PURP CL1 PURP come catch.SG crocodile
"I must see the hyena to tell it to come catch the crocodile lying there."

mtícē kwá bà ǀōā kē gǀè-ā g‼ȍhò
why Q 2SG NEG PAST come-TR work
"Why didn't you come to work?"

hȁ má kò kē ǁȁn̏ kú cŋ̏ djūí kā hȁ ǁàȅ-ā tí kē TB ǁ'à-ān tí
CL1 TOP CE past NEG.IMP HAB.IMP drink beer CL4 CL1 hold-TR PAST TR tuberculosis sick-TR PAST
"He was not supposed to drink beer anymore because he had tuberculosis" [lit. he was held by TB sickness]

hȁ má kò ǁáúlè ǃxō
CL1 TOP CE hunt elephant
"He is supposed to hunt elephants but he didn't."

mí má kā ǁàȅ nǃùm̀ kā ŋ̄ŋ̀ kā-è cālā n‼á'm̀ g‼à è-tcā
1SG TOP PROG? hold rock CL4 PR CL4-REL NONFIRSTH.EV hit lie.down.PL 1PL.EX-DU
"I hold this rock so that it cannot fall down and kill us."
