= Dental click =

Click articulated at the upper teeth

Dental click type

ǀ

ʇ
- IPA number: 177, 201

Audio sample
- source · help

Encoding
- Entity (decimal): &#448;&#647;
- Unicode (hex): U+01C0 U+0287
- X-SAMPA: |\
- Braille: ⠯ (braille pattern dots-12346) ⠹ (braille pattern dots-1456)
Image

Tenuis dental click (velar)

kǀ kʇ

ᵏǀ ᵏʇ

ǀ ʇ

Voiced dental click (velar)

ɡǀ ɡʇ

ᶢǀ ᶢʇ

ᵈǀ

ǀ̬ ʇ̬

Dental nasal click (velar)

ŋǀ ŋʇ

ᵑǀ ᵑʇ

ⁿǀ

ǀ̃ ʇ̃

Tenuis dental click (uvular)

qǀ qʇ

𐞥ǀ 𐞥ʇ

Voiced dental click (uvular)

ɢǀ ɢʇ

𐞒ǀ 𐞒ʇ

Dental nasal click (uvular)

ɴǀ ɴʇ

ᶰǀ ᶰʇ

Dental (or more precisely denti-alveolar) clicks are a family of click consonants found, as constituents of words, only in Africa and in the Damin ritual jargon of Australia.

In English, the tut-tut! (British spelling, "tutting") or tsk! tsk! (American spelling, "tsking") sound used to express disapproval or pity is an unreleased dental click, although it is not a lexical phoneme (a sound that distinguishes words) in English but a paralinguistic speech-sound. Similarly paralinguistic usage of dental clicks is made in certain other languages, but the meaning thereof differs widely between many of the languages (e.g., affirmation in Somali but negation in many varieties of Arabic, Turkish and the languages of the Balkans).

The symbol in the International Phonetic Alphabet that represents the place of articulation of these sounds is ⟨ǀ⟩, a vertical bar. Prior to 1989, ⟨ʇ⟩ was the IPA letter for the dental clicks. It is still occasionally used where the symbol ⟨ǀ⟩ would be confounded with other symbols, such as prosody marks, or simply because in many fonts the vertical bar is indistinguishable from a lowercase L or capital I. Either letter may be combined with a second letter or a diacritic to indicate voicing and the manner of articulation, though this is commonly omitted for tenuis clicks.

== Transcription ==
In official IPA transcriptions, the click letter is combined with a ⟨k ɡ ŋ q ɢ ɴ⟩ via a tie bar, though ⟨k⟩ is frequently omitted and assumed. Many authors instead use a superscript ⟨k ɡ ŋ q ɢ ɴ⟩ without the tie bar, again often omitting ⟨k⟩. Either letter, whether baseline or superscript, is usually placed before the click letter, but may come after when the release of the velar or uvular occlusion is audible. A third convention is the click letter with diacritics for voicelessness, voicing and nasalization; this would require something like the guttural diacritic ◌̴ to distinguish uvular dental clicks. Common dental clicks in these three transcriptions are:

Transcription convention			Description
I	II	III	Description
⟨k͜ǀ⟩	⟨ᵏǀ⟩	⟨ǀ⟩	Tenuis dental click
⟨k͜ǀʰ⟩	⟨ᵏǀʰ⟩	⟨ǀʰ⟩	Aspirated dental click
⟨ɡ͜ǀ⟩	⟨ᶢǀ⟩	⟨ǀ̬⟩	Voiced dental click
⟨ŋ͜ǀ⟩	⟨ᵑǀ⟩	⟨ǀ̬̃⟩	Dental nasal click
⟨ŋ̊͜ǀʰ⟩	⟨ᵑ̊ǀʰ⟩	⟨ǀ̥̃ʰ⟩	Aspirated dental nasal click
⟨ŋ͜ǀˀ⟩	⟨ᵑǀˀ⟩	⟨ǀ̃ˀ⟩	Glottalized dental nasal click
⟨q͜ǀ⟩	⟨𐞥ǀ⟩	⟨ǀ̴⟩	Tenuis dental uvular click
⟨q͜ǀʰ⟩	⟨𐞥ǀʰ⟩	⟨ǀ̴ʰ⟩	Aspirated dental uvular click
⟨ɢ͜ǀ⟩	⟨𐞒ǀ⟩	⟨ǀ̴̬⟩	Voiced dental uvular click
⟨ɴ͜ǀ⟩	⟨ᶰǀ⟩	⟨ǀ̴̬̃⟩	Dental nasal uvular click
⟨ɴ̥͜ǀʰ⟩	⟨ᶰ̥ǀʰ⟩	⟨ǀ̴̥̃ʰ⟩	Aspirated dental nasal uvular click
⟨ɴ͜ǀˀ⟩	⟨ᶰǀˀ⟩	⟨ǀ̴̃ˀ⟩	Glottalized dental nasal uvular click

The last is what is heard in the sound sample at right, as non-native speakers tend to glottalize clicks to avoid nasalizing them.

In the orthographies of individual languages, the letters and digraphs for dental clicks may be based on either the vertical bar symbol of the IPA, ⟨ǀ⟩, or on the Latin ⟨c⟩ of Bantu convention. Nama and most Bushman languages use the former; Naro, Sandawe, and Zulu use the latter.

== Features ==
Features of dental clicks:

- The basic articulation may be voiced, nasal, aspirated, glottalized, etc.
- The forward place of articulation is typically dental (or denti-alveolar) and laminal, which means it is articulated with the tip of the tongue against the alveolar ridge or the upper teeth, but depending on the language may be interdental or even apical. The release is a noisy, affricate-like sound.
- Clicks may be oral or nasal, which means that the airflow is either restricted to the mouth, or passes through the nose as well.
- They are median consonants, which means they are produced by releasing the airstream at the midline of the tongue, rather than at the sides.
- The airstream mechanism is lingual ingressive (also known as velaric ingressive), which means a pocket of air trapped between two closures is rarefied by a "sucking" action of the tongue, rather than being moved by the glottis or the lungs/diaphragm. The release of the forward closure produces the "click" sound. Voiced and nasal clicks have a simultaneous pulmonic egressive airstream.

== Occurrence ==
Dental clicks are common in Khoisan languages and the neighboring Nguni languages, such as Zulu and Xhosa. In the Nguni languages, the tenuis click is denoted by the letter c, the murmured click by gc, the aspirated click by ch, and the nasal click by nc. The prenasalized clicks are written ngc and nkc.

The Cushitic language Dahalo has four clicks, all of them nasalized: [ᵑ̊ʇ, ᵑʇ, ᵑ̊ʇʷ, ᵑʇʷ].

Dental clicks may also be used para-linguistically. For example, English speakers use a plain dental click, usually written tsk or tut (and often reduplicated tsk-tsk or tut-tut; these spellings often lead to spelling pronunciations /tɪsk/ or /tʌt/), as an interjection to express commiseration, disapproval, irritation, or to call a small animal. German (ts or tss), Hungarian (cöccögés), Persian (noch), Portuguese (tsc), Russian (ts-ts-ts; sound file) Spanish (ts) and French (t-t-t-t) speakers use the dental click in a similar way as English.

The dental click is also used para-linguistically in Semitic languages such as Arabic, Hebrew and Indo-European Pashto, and Persian where it is transcribed as نچ/noch and is also used as a negative response to a "yes or no" question (including Dari and Tajiki). It is also used in some languages spoken in regions closer to, or in, Europe, such as Turkish, Albanian, Greek, Bulgarian, Italian, Portuguese, Spanish, Romanian or Serbo-Croatian to denote a negative response to a "yes or no" question. The dental click is sometimes accompanied by an upward motion of the head.

Language	Word	IPA	Meaning
Zulu	icici	[iːᵏǀíːᵏǀi]	earring
Zulu	ukuchaza	[úɠuˈᵏǀʰáːza̤]	to fascinate
Zulu	isigcino	[ísiᶢǀʱǐ̤ːno]	end
Zulu	incwancwa	[iᵑǀwáːᵑǀwa]	sour corn meal
Zulu	ingcosi	[iᵑǀʱǒ̤ːsi]	a bit
Hadza	cinambo	[ᵏǀinambo]	firefly
Hadza	cheta	[ᵏǀʰeta]	to be happy
Hadza	minca	[miᵑǀa]	to smack one's lips
Hadza	tacce	[taᵑǀˀe]	rope
Khoekhoe	ǀgurub	[ᵏǀȕɾȕp]	dry autumn leaves
Khoekhoe	ǀnam	[ᵑǀȁm̀]	to love
Khoekhoe	ǀHōǂgaeb	[ᵑ̊ǀʰȍòǂàè̯p]	November
Khoekhoe	ǀoroǀoro	[ᵑǀˀòɾőᵑǀˀòɾȍ]	to wear out
Khoekhoe	ǀkhore	[ᵏǀ͡χòɾe̋]	to divine, prophesize

== See also ==
- Alveolar click
- Bilabial click
- Lateral click
- Palatal click
- Retroflex click
- Index of phonetics articles

== Notes ==
Place →	Labial					Coronal										Dorsal					Laryngeal			
Manner ↓	Bilabial		Labiodental		Linguolabial		Dental		Alveolar		Postalveolar		Retroflex		(Alveolo-)palatal		Velar		Uvular		Pharyngeal/epiglottal		Glottal	
Nasal	m̥	m	ɱ̊	ɱ		n̼	n̪̊	n̪	n̥	n	n̠̊	n̠	ɳ̊	ɳ	ɲ̊	ɲ	ŋ̊	ŋ	ɴ̥	ɴ				
Plosive	p	b	p̪	b̪	t̼	d̼	t̪	d̪	t	d			ʈ	ɖ	c	ɟ	k	ɡ	q	ɢ	ʡ		ʔ	
Sibilant affricate							t̪s̪	d̪z̪	ts	dz	t̠ʃ	d̠ʒ	tʂ	dʐ	tɕ	dʑ								
Non-sibilant affricate	pɸ	bβ	p̪f	b̪v			t̪θ	d̪ð	tɹ̝̊	dɹ̝	t̠ɹ̠̊˔	d̠ɹ̠˔			cç	ɟʝ	kx	ɡɣ	qχ	ɢʁ	ʡʜ	ʡʢ	ʔh	
Sibilant fricative							s̪	z̪	s	z	ʃ	ʒ	ʂ	ʐ	ɕ	ʑ								
Non-sibilant fricative	ɸ	β	f	v	θ̼	ð̼	θ	ð	θ̠	ð̠	ɹ̠̊˔	ɹ̠˔	ɻ̊˔	ɻ˔	ç	ʝ	x	ɣ	χ	ʁ	ħ	ʕ	h	ɦ
Approximant		β̞		ʋ				ð̞		ɹ		ɹ̠		ɻ		j		ɰ						˷
Tap/flap		ⱱ̟		ⱱ					ɾ̥	ɾ			ɽ̊	ɽ						ɢ̆		ʡ̆		
Trill	ʙ̥	ʙ							r̥	r		r̠	ɽ̊r̥	ɽr					ʀ̥	ʀ	ʜ	ʢ		
Lateral affricate									tɬ	dɮ			tꞎ	d𝼅	c𝼆	ɟʎ̝	k𝼄	ɡʟ̝						
Lateral fricative							ɬ̪		ɬ	ɮ			ꞎ	𝼅	𝼆	ʎ̝	𝼄	ʟ̝						
Lateral approximant								l̪	l̥	l		l̠	ɭ̊	ɭ	ʎ̥	ʎ	ʟ̥	ʟ		ʟ̠				
Lateral tap/flap									ɺ̥	ɺ			𝼈̊	𝼈		ʎ̆		ʟ̆						

		BL	LD	D	A	PA	RF	P	V	U
Implosive	Voiced	ɓ			ɗ		ᶑ	ʄ	ɠ	ʛ
Implosive	Voiceless	ɓ̥			ɗ̥		ᶑ̊	ʄ̊	ɠ̊	ʛ̥
Ejective	Stop	pʼ			tʼ		ʈʼ	cʼ	kʼ	qʼ
Ejective	Affricate		p̪fʼ	t̪θʼ	tsʼ	t̠ʃʼ	tʂʼ	tɕʼ	kxʼ	qχʼ
Ejective	Fricative	ɸʼ	fʼ	θʼ	sʼ	ʃʼ	ʂʼ	ɕʼ	xʼ	χʼ
Ejective	Lateral affricate				tɬʼ			c𝼆ʼ	k𝼄ʼ	q𝼄ʼ
Ejective	Lateral fricative				ɬʼ					
Click (top: velar; bottom: uvular)	Tenuis	kʘ qʘ		kǀ qǀ	kǃ qǃ		k𝼊 q𝼊	kǂ qǂ		
Click (top: velar; bottom: uvular)	Voiced	ɡʘ ɢʘ		ɡǀ ɢǀ	ɡǃ ɢǃ		ɡ𝼊 ɢ𝼊	ɡǂ ɢǂ		
Click (top: velar; bottom: uvular)	Nasal	ŋʘ ɴʘ		ŋǀ ɴǀ	ŋǃ ɴǃ		ŋ𝼊 ɴ𝼊	ŋǂ ɴǂ	ʞ	
Click (top: velar; bottom: uvular)	Tenuis lateral				kǁ qǁ					
Click (top: velar; bottom: uvular)	Voiced lateral				ɡǁ ɢǁ					
Click (top: velar; bottom: uvular)	Nasal lateral				ŋǁ ɴǁ					
