= Luo script =

Script for writing Luo languages

Luo script Ndiko Jonam
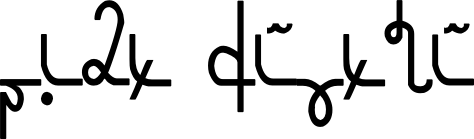
- Script type: Alphabet
- Creator: Kefa Ombewa and Paul Sidandi
- Period: 2009 to present
- Direction: Left-to-right
- Languages: Luo languages

The Luo alphabet (also known as the Luo Lakeside script, Ndiko Jonam) was invented by Kefa Ombewa and Paul Sidandi between 2009 and 2012 to write Luo languages, specifically Dholuo of Kenya, in a unique way. The script is a left-to-right alphabet, with 33 letters connected to each other by a line running along the bottom.

== History ==
Other African writing systems have been developed before and some are still in use today. Work on the Luo alphabet started in 2009 by Kefa Ombewa. At the same time Paul Sidandi started his work on Luo numerals independently. The two men met on Twitter in 2013 and decided to combine the alphabet and the numerals to be a single project and the font produced was named KefaSidandi font. Digitization of the work started with many challenges. Initially only a bitmap-font was available. Thereafter in order to produce the true-type font Internet usage, Will Were joined to produce the font glyphs. The work was completed on June 12, 2012, when the first true-type font was produced. This led to the ability to embed the script on the Luo Alphabet website and made the font downloadable for other interested users. The Luo alphabet first came into the limelight in Kenya when Kefa Ombewa conducted an interview with Kenya Television Network (KTN) in 2014.

== Letters ==
Luo script	Latin	IPA
	a	/a/
	b	/b/
	ch	/tʃ/
	d	/d/
	e	/e/
	f	/f/
	g	/g/
	h	/h/
	i	/i/
	j	/ɟ/
	k	/k/
	l	/l/
	m	/m/
	mb	/ᵐb/
	n	/n/
	nd	/ⁿd/
	ng'	/ŋ/
	nj	/ᶮɟ/
	ng	/ᵑɡ/
	ny	/ɲ/
	o	/o/
	p	/p/
	r	/r/
	s	/s/
	t	/t/
	th	/t̪/
	dh	/d̪/
	u	/u/
	w	/w/
	y	/j/

The sounds below have been adopted by Luo speakers for sounds borrowed from other languages:

Phoneme	Luo
/z/	
/ʃ/ (Kenya), /kǃ/ (Botswana)	
/v/	

was created for the English sh sound, but in Botswana it is used for the q click of Tswana.

== Example ==

The writing above says Yuak ogwal ok mon dhok modho in Luo, translated as "The croak of a frog doesn't prevent cattle from drinking".

== Numerals ==
The Luo system has its own symbols for numbers. The digits range from zero to nine for mathematical use but larger digits are available for colloquial use. They are graphic representations of finger-counting, rather like SignWriting. The table below shows the digits zero to nine.

Arabic	Luo
0	
1	
2	
3	
4	
5	
6	
7	
8	
9	
10	
207	

== Vowel diacritics ==
In this alphabet, there are five vowels represented by the same stroke. The difference is in the diacritic added to the vowel stroke. These diacritics do not show vowel stress, tone or length as can be in other languages or writing systems. Luo is a tonal language i.e. the same written word said in a different tone can mean a different thing. These tones vary within vowels but are never written thereby making it important to get the right context of the word. The table below shows the vowels, notice the different diacritics applied on the same stroke.

Latin	Luo
a	
e	
i	
o	
u	

== Punctuation and symbols ==
Different systems have traditionally used different punctuation marks. Some did not even have any punctuation at all. In the Luo system commas, full-stops, slash, colon, semi-colon, question marks, brackets, hyphens, etc. are borrowed from the Latin system and are used in the same way. Mathematical or scientific symbols are also borrowed from the Latin system in the western world. These symbols include $, %, @, &, +, =, etc.
