= Damin =

Ceremonial language of Australia

- Demiin
- Pronunciation: [t̺æmiːn]
- Created by: the Lardil or Yangkaal people
- Setting and usage: Initiation language for men, used by the Lardil people of Mornington Island
- Extinct: 1970s?
- Purpose: Constructed language: Ritual language; Damin

Language codes
- ISO 639-3: qda (unofficial) (Note: The codes qda and art-x-damin have been registered for Damin at the ConLang Code Registry.)
- Glottolog: None
- Linguasphere: 29-TAA-bb
- IETF: art-x-damin

Damin (Demiin in the practical orthography of Lardil) is a ceremonial language register formerly used by the advanced initiated men of the Aboriginal Lardil (Leerdil in the practical orthography) and Yangkaal peoples of northern Australia. Damin is the only language outside of Africa to use click consonants, and used the grammatical structures of the Lardil and Yangkaal languages.

== Name ==
The Lardil word Demiin can be translated as 'being silent'.

== History ==
=== Origin ===
The origin of Damin is unclear. The Lardil and the Yangkaal say that Damin was created by a mythological figure in Dreamtime. Hale and colleagues believe that it was invented by Lardil elders; it has several aspects found in language games around the world, such as turning nasal occlusives such as m and n into nasal clicks, doubling consonants, and the like. Evans and colleagues, after studying the mythology of both tribes, speculate that it was the Yangkaal elders who invented Damin and passed it to the Lardil. According to Fleming (2017), "the eccentric features of Damin developed in an emergent and unplanned manner in which conventionalized paralinguistic phonations became semanticized as they were linked up with a signed language employed by first-order male initiates".

=== Past ceremonial use ===
The Lardil had two initiation ceremonies for men, namely luruku, which involved circumcision, and warama, which involved penile subincision. There were no ceremonies for women, although women did play an important role in these ceremonies, especially in the luruku ceremony.

It is sometimes said that Damin was a secret language, but this is misleading since there was no attempt to prevent the uninitiated members of the Leerdil tribe from overhearing it. However it was taught during the warama ceremony and, therefore, in isolation from the uninitiated. At least one elder is known, who, though not having been subincised, had an excellent command of Damin, but this seems to have been a unique case.

Damin lexical words were organised into semantic fields and shouted out to the initiate in a single session. As each word was announced, a second speaker gave its Lardil equivalent. However, it normally took several sessions before a novice mastered the basics and could use Damin openly in the community. One speaker did claim to have learned to speak Damin in a single session, but on the other hand two senior warama men admitted that they lacked a firm command of the register.

Once Damin had been learned, the speakers were known as Demiinkurlda ("Damin possessors"). They spoke the register particularly in ritual contexts, but also in everyday secular life, when foraging, sitting about gossiping, and the like.

=== Decline ===
The cultural traditions of the Lardil and Yangkaal have been in decline for several decades, and the Lardil and Yangkaal languages are nearly extinct. The last warama ceremony was held in the 1950s, so nowadays Damin is no longer in use by either the Yangkaal or the Lardil.

However, recently a revival of cultural traditions has begun, and luruku has been celebrated. It remains to be seen whether warama ceremonies will also be reactivated.

== Phonology ==
=== Vowels ===
Damin words had three of Lardil's four pairs of vowels, [a, aː, i, iː, u, uː]; the fourth, [æ, æː] (written ⟨e, ee⟩ in the practical orthography), is only found in Lardil-derived grammatical suffixes.

	Front		Central		Back	
	short	long	short	long	short	long
Close	i	iː			u	uː
Open	(æ)	(æː)	a	aː		

It is possible that in monosyllabic words the distinction between long and short vowels is conditioned. See #phonotactics below.

=== Consonants ===
Damin was the only click language outside Africa, though lexical clicks do occur elsewhere in language games such as Chinese nursery rhymes. Many consonants are "rearticulated", meaning that the release is repeated. In the word j2iwu (also written jjiwu), for example, the consonant j is articulated twice: [t̠ʲ\t̠ʲiwu], which on its own may even sound like [t̠ʲit̠ʲiwu]. Damin used only some of the consonants of everyday Lardil (which are all pulmonic), but they were augmented by four other airstream mechanisms: lingual ingressive (the nasal clicks), glottalic egressive (a velar ejective), pulmonic ingressive (an indrawn lateral fricative), and lingual egressive (a bilabial 'spurt'). Even some of the pulmonic egressive consonants are exotic for the Australian context: fricatives, voiceless nasals, bilabial trills, and uvular affricates.

The consonants of Damin, in the practical orthography and IPA equivalents, were the following: (Note: The IPA symbols used by Hale & Nash are not always clear without the accompanying description in the text, and sometimes even with that context. For example, j2 is described as a rearticulated Lardil j (see also McKnight 1999: 254), but also alternatively as a voiced fricative, which however is transcribed as a voiceless fricative ⟨ʆ⟩, is an old letter for ⟨ʃʲ⟩. The IPA letters for a palatal nasal click, ⟨ŋ͡ǂ⟩, are used for what is described as "apico-domal" rn!, perhaps because retroflex clicks did not have a proper symbol in IPA at the time. p' is transcribed and labeled 'ejective', but also transcribed as an egressive click, and in the text is clarified as being "produced with increased velaric (not laryngeal) pressure." The dual transcription in their IPA chart suggests that they are speaking of two allophones. Note the nasal clicks are simply labeled 'nasals', following their phonological analysis.)

Damin lexical consonants
		Bilabial	Alveolar		Postalveolar		Velar	Uvular
		Bilabial	laminal	apical	apical	laminal	Velar	Uvular
Plosive	voiceless	b [p]	th [t̻]	d [t̺]	(rd [ʈ])	j [t̠ʲ] j2 [t̠ʲ\t̠ʲ], [ʃʲ]	k [k]	
Plosive	ejective	p' [pʼ], [ʘ↑] (in p'ny, p'ng only)					k' [kʼ]	
Nasal	voiced	(m [m])	(nh [n̻])	n [n̺] (coda only)	(rn [ɳ])	ny [n̠ʲ] (in fny, p'ny only)	ng [ŋ]	
Nasal	voiceless						ng* [ŋ̊]	
Flap				rr [ɾ]				
Trill		pr [ʙ] pr2 [ʙ\ʙ] (in pr2y only?)						
Approximant	median				(r [ɻ] ~ rl [ɭ])	y [j]	w [w]	
Approximant	lateral			(l [l])	(r [ɻ] ~ rl [ɭ])			
Click	nasal	m! [ʘ̃]	nh!2 [ʇ̃\ʇ̃]	n! [ʗ̃] n!2 [ʗ̃\ʗ̃]	rn! [ψ̃] rn!2 [ψ̃\ψ̃]			
Click	lingual egressive	[ʘ↑] (see ejectives)						
Fricative	voiceless	f [ɸ]						
Fricative	voiceless ingressive			l* [ɬ↓ʔ]				
Affricate		pf [pɸ]						qx [qχ]

The Lardil consonants rd, rn, rl, m, n, l, r (color-coded) are only found in Lardil grammatical suffixes used in Damin, if they occur at all; stronger Damin may replace many of these with simpler morphology.

There is no apical alveolar–retroflex distinction in Damin root words, with the apparent exception of the clicks. In Lardil, the distinction is neutralised to apico-domal in word-initial position, but in Damin it is neutralised to apical alveolar in all positions. However, a contrast may occur when Lardil suffixes are added to Damin roots.

L* is described as "ingressive with egressive glottalic release".

pf is transcribed [pɸ] but "is possibly a pre-stopped alternate" of f.

Some of the consonants listed above only occur in clusters. /n̺/ only occurs as a coda.

=== Phonotactics ===
Damin consonant clusters at the beginning of a word are p'ny [ʘ↑n̠ʲ], p'ng [ʘ↑ŋ], fny [ɸn̠ʲ], fng [ɸŋ], fy [ɸj], pr2y [ʙ\ʙj], thrr [t̻ɾ]. Words in normal Lardil may not begin with a cluster. However, Lardil has several clusters in the middle of words, and many of these are not found in Damin words, as Damin only allows n [n̺] and rr [ɾ] in a syllable coda. The attested stem-medial Damin clusters are rrd, rrth, rrk, rrb, jb, though j of jb is not otherwise allowed in coda position. Other clusters, such as nasal–stop, are produced by Lardil grammatical suffixes, and indeed the future suffix is -ngkur, which produces a three-consonant cluster after a coda, as on wijburrngkur 'firewood.fut'.

Hale & Nash posit that the minimum Damin syllable shape is CVV or CCV. (In Lardil it is CVV.) Words they transcribe as monosyllabic CV are restricted to cases where C is k', ng*, l* ([kʼ], [ŋ̊], [ɬ↓ʔ]), suggesting that these are complex consonants, possibly underlyingly rearticulated k2, ng2, l2 (/k\k, ŋ\ŋ, l\l/, rather as [ɕ] is an alternative realization of j2 /t̠ʲ\t̠ʲ/ and as thrr [t̻ɾ] might be analyzed as d2 /t̺\t̺/). (Note however that some transcriptions do not record CV words, with CVV instead.) In polysyllabic words and compounds, however, long and short vowels appear to contrast, with one recorded minimal pair being didi 'to affect/harm' vs diidi 'to act' (as in 'cut' firewood vs 'gather' firewood).

With only about 200 roots in Damin, not all consonants occur before all three vowels. However, as several consonants and consonant clusters are attested from only a single root, there are certain to be accidental gaps, and it is not clear that any gaps are due to phonotactic constraints.

== Morphology and lexicon ==
Damin had a much more restricted and generic lexicon than everyday language. With only about 200 lexical roots, each word in Damin stood for several words of Lardil or Yangkaal. It had only two pronouns (n!aa "me" (ego) and n!uu "not me" (alter)), for example, compared to Lardil's nineteen, and used kurri 'not' as an antonymic prefix (j2iwu "small", kurrij2iwu "large").

Grammatically, the Damin registers of the Lardil and Yangkaal use all the grammatical morphology of those languages, and so therefore are broadly similar, though it does not employ the phonologically conditioned alternations of that morphology.

Damin is spoken by replacing the lexical roots of ordinary Lardil with Damin words. Apart from a leveling of grammatical allomorphs, the grammar remains the same.

{Ordinary Lardil:} ngithun dunji-kan ngawa waang-kur werneng-kiyath-ur.
Damin: n!aa n!2a-kan nh!2u diidith-ur m!ii-ngkiyath-ur.
{} my wife's.younger.brother-GEN dog go-FUT food-go-FUT
My brother-in-law's dog is going to go hunting.

Some vocabulary:

n!aa 'ego', n!uu 'alter'
kaa 'now', kaawi 'not now'
l*i 'bony fish', thii 'elasmobranch'
ngaajpu 'human', wuujpu 'animal', wiijpu 'wood' (incl. woody plants), kuujpu 'stone'
m!ii 'vegetable food', wii 'meat/food', (Note: more generally, any amorphous food; also food in the abstract) n!2u 'liquid', thuu 'sea mammal', thuuwu 'land mammal'
didi 'harm (affect harmfully)', diidi 'act', kuudi 'see', kuuku 'hear, feel', yiidi 'be (in a place)', wiiwi 'burn', wiidi 'spear', ngaa 'die, decay', fyuu 'fall; the cardinal directions'
n!aa thuuku 'point on body', wii 'surface on body', nguu 'head', k'uu 'eye', nguuwii 'hand, foot'
thuuku 'one, another; place', kurrijpi 'two; hither, close; short'

Antonymic derivation with kurri 'not':

j2iwu 'small', kurrij2iwu 'large' (not small)
thuuku 'one', kurrithuuku 'many' (not one)
kurrijpi 'short', kurrikurrijpi 'long' (not short)
kawukawu 'light', kurrikawukawu 'heavy' (not light)

Specific reference requires paraphrasing. For example, a sandpiper is called a 'person-burning creature' (ngaajpu wiiwi-n wuujpu 'human burn-nom animal') in reference to its role as a character in the Rainbow Serpent Story, while a wooden axe is 'wood that (negatively) affects honey' (m!iwu didi-i-n wiijpu 'honey affect-pass-nom wood')

There is some suggestion of internal morphology or compounding, as suggested by the patterns in the word list above. For example, m!iwu '(native) beehive, honey' and wum!i 'sp. mud crab' may derive from m!ii 'food' and wuu 'mud shell clam'.

== Sources ==
- Fleming, Luke (2017). "Artificial language, natural history: Speech, sign, and sound in the emergence of Damin". Language & Communication. 56: 1–18. doi:10.1016/j.langcom.2017.01.001.
- Hale, K.; Nash, D. (1997). "Lardil and Damin Phonotactics". In Tryon, Darrell; Walsh, Michael (eds.). Boundary Rider: Essays in Honour of Geoffrey O'Grady. doi:10.15144/PL-C136.
- McKnight, D. (1999). People, Countries and the Rainbow Serpent.
