= Retroflex consonant =

Type of consonant articulation

Retroflex

◌̢

◌̣

Subapical retroflex plosive

A retroflex (/ˈrɛtrəflɛks, -roʊ-/) consonant is a coronal consonant where the tongue has a flat, concave, or even curled shape, and is articulated between the alveolar ridge and the hard palate. They are sometimes referred to as cerebral consonants—especially in Indology. Other terms are domal and cacuminal (/kəˈkjuːmɪnəl/), though in rare cases either word can mean palatal consonants more broadly.

The Latin-derived word retroflex means "bent back"; some retroflex consonants are pronounced with the tongue fully curled back so that articulation involves the underside of the tongue tip (subapical). These sounds are sometimes described as "true" retroflex consonants. However, retroflexes are commonly taken to include other consonants having a similar place of articulation without such extreme curling of the tongue; these may be articulated with the tongue tip (apical) or the tongue blade (laminal). When apical, they have been called apico-domal or apico-palatal consonants.

== Types ==
Retroflex consonants, like other coronal consonants, come in several varieties, depending on the shape of the tongue. The tongue may be either flat or concave, or even with the tip curled back. The point of contact on the tongue may be with the tip (apical), with the blade (laminal), or with the underside of the tongue (subapical). The point of contact on the roof of the mouth may be with the alveolar ridge (alveolar), the area behind the alveolar ridge (postalveolar), or the hard palate (palatal). Finally, both sibilant (fricative or affricate) and nonsibilant (stop, nasal, lateral, rhotic) consonants can have a retroflex articulation.

The greatest variety of combinations occurs with sibilants, as small changes in tongue shape and position cause significant changes in the resulting sound. Retroflex sounds generally have a duller, lower-pitched sound than other alveolar or postalveolar consonants, with subapical palatals the most extreme and lowest-pitched.

The main combinations normally observed are:

- Laminal post-alveolar, with a flat tongue. These occur, for example, in Polish cz, sz, ż (rz), dż.
- Apical post-alveolar, with a somewhat concave tongue. These occur, for example, in Mandarin zh, ch, sh, r, Hindi and most other Indo-Aryan languages, and most Australian languages.
- Subapical palatal, with a highly concave tongue, which occur particularly in the Dravidian languages and some Indo-Aryan languages. They are the dullest and lowest-pitched type and, after a vowel, often add strong r-coloring to the vowel and sound as if an American English r occurred between the vowel and consonant. They are not a place of articulation, as the IPA chart implies, but a shape of the tongue analogous to laminal and apical.

Subapical sounds are sometimes called "true retroflex" because of the curled-back shape of the tongue, and the other sounds sometimes go by other names. For example, Peter Ladefoged and Ian Maddieson prefer to call the laminal post-alveolar sounds "flat post-alveolar".

=== Other sounds ===
Retroflex sounds must be distinguished from other consonants made in the same parts of the mouth:

- the palato-alveolar consonants (e.g., [ʃ ʒ]), such as the sh, ch, and zh in English words like ship, chip and vision
- the alveolo-palatal consonants (e.g., [ɕ ʑ]), such as the j, q, and x in Mandarin Chinese
- the dorsal palatal consonants (e.g., [ç ʝ ɲ]), such as the ch [ç] in German ich or the ñ [ɲ] in Spanish año
- the grooved alveolar consonants (e.g., [s z]), such as the s and z in English words like sip and zip

The first three types of sounds above have a convex tongue shape, which gives them an additional secondary articulation of palatalization. The last type has a groove running down the center line of the tongue, which gives it a strong hissing quality. Retroflex sounds have a flat or concave shape, with no associated palatalization, and no groove running down the tongue. The term "retroflex" literally means "bent back" (concave), although consonants with a flat tongue shape are also commonly considered retroflex.

The velar bunched approximant found in northern varieties of Dutch and some varieties of American English is acoustically similar to the retroflex approximant. It is articulated with the body of the tongue bunched up at the velum.

== Transcription ==
=== IPA transcription ===
In the International Phonetic Alphabet, the symbols for retroflex consonants are typically the same as for the alveolar consonants, but with the addition of a right-facing hook to the bottom of the symbol.

Retroflex consonants are transcribed in the International Phonetic Alphabet as follows:

| IPA | Description | Example | | | |
| IPA | Description | Language | Orthography | IPA | Meaning |
|---|---|---|---|---|---|
| ɳ̊ | voiceless retroflex nasal | Iaai | hnrathu | [ɳ̊aθu] | 'cold' |
| ɳ | voiced retroflex nasal | Punjabi | ਗਾਣਾ / گاݨا | [ˈgaːɳaˑ] | song |
| ɳ | voiced retroflex nasal | Telugu | పణము | [paɳamu] | stake; bet |
| ɳ | voiced retroflex nasal | Swedish | Vänern | [ˈvæːnɛɳ] | Vänern |
| ʈ | voiceless retroflex plosive | Hindi / Urdu | टांग / ٹانگ | [ʈaːŋg] | leg |
| ʈ | voiceless retroflex plosive | Telugu | టెక్కెము | [ʈekːkemu] | banner; pennant |
| ɖ | voiced retroflex plosive | Somali | Bandhig | [banːɖig] | presentation |
| ɖ | voiced retroflex plosive | Hindi / Urdu | डब्बा / ڈبا | [ɖəbːaː] | box |
| ɖ | voiced retroflex plosive | Telugu | డగ్గర | [ɖagːgara] | phantom; apparition |
| ʈ͡ʂ | voiceless retroflex affricate | Torwali | ڇووو | [ʈ͡ʂuwu] | to sew |
| ɖ͡ʐ | voiced retroflex affricate | Yi | ꎐ / rry | [ɖ͡ʐɪ˧] | tooth |
| ʂ | voiceless retroflex fricative | Mandarin | 上海 (Shànghǎi) | [ʂɑ̂ŋ.xàɪ] | Shanghai |
| ʂ | voiceless retroflex fricative | Sanskrit | भाषा | [bʱɑ́ːʂɑː] | language |
| ʂ | voiceless retroflex fricative | Telugu | మిష | [miʂa] | pretext |
| ʐ | voiced retroflex fricative | Russian | жаба | [ˈʐabə] | toad |
| ʐ | voiced retroflex fricative | Polish | żaba | [ˈʐaba] | frog |
| ɻ̊˔ | voiceless retroflex non-sibilant fricative | Ormuri | | | |
| ɻ˔ | voiced retroflex non-sibilant fricative | English (Eastern Cape) | red | [ɻ˔ed] | 'red' |
| ɻ | voiced retroflex approximant | Tamil | தமிழ் | [t̪ɐmɨɻ] | Tamil |
| ɭ | voiced retroflex lateral approximant | Tamil | ஆள் | [ɑːɭ] | person |
| ɭ | voiced retroflex lateral approximant | Telugu | నెళవు | [neɭawu] | familiarity; acquaintance |
| ɭ | voiced retroflex lateral approximant | Swedish | Karlstad | [ˈkʰɑːɭ.sta] | Karlstad |
| ɽ̊ | voiceless retroflex flap | Dhivehi (Note: Some dialects, maybe a fricative, flap or a trill.) | koshani | /koɽ̊͜r̊ani/ | 'cutting' |
| ɽ | voiced retroflex flap | Hausa | shaara | [ʃáːɽa] | sweeping |
| ɽ | voiced retroflex flap | Hindi / Urdu | कीचड़ / کیچڑ पहाड़/پہاڑ | [kiːt͡ʃəɽ] [pəˈɦaːɽ] | mud mountain |
| ɽ͡r̥ | voiceless retroflex trill | Dhivehi | goshani | /ɡoɽ̊ani/ | 'good' |
| ɽ͡r | voiced retroflex trill | Wintu | boloy noṛ-toṛoṛ | [boloj noɽr toɽoɽr] | '(ridge on a trail from Hayfork to Hyampom)' |
| 𝼈̊ | voiceless retroflex lateral flap | Wahgi | | | |
| 𝼈 | voiced retroflex lateral flap | Pashto | ړوند | [𝼈und] | blind |
| 𝼈 | voiced retroflex lateral flap | Marathi | बाळ | [ˈbɑː𝼈] | baby |
| ꞎ | voiceless retroflex lateral fricative | Toda | pü·ł̣ | [pʏːꞎ] | summer |
| 𝼅 | voiced retroflex lateral fricative | Ao | | | |
| ʈ͡ꞎ | voiceless retroflex lateral affricate | Bhadarwahi | ट्ळा | [ʈ͡ꞎaː] | three |
| ɖ͡𝼅 | voiced retroflex lateral affricate | Bhadarwahi | हैड्ळ | [haiɖ͡𝼅] | turmeric |
| ʈʼ | retroflex ejective stop | Yokuts | ṭʼa∙yʼ | [ʈʼaːjˀ] | 'down feather' |
| ʈ͡ʂʼ | retroflex ejective affricate | Gwichʼin | etrʼuu | [ɛʈ͡ʂʼu:] | arctic tern |
| ᶑ̥ (𝼉) | voiceless retroflex implosive | Ngiti | | | |
| ᶑ | voiced retroflex implosive | Ngadha | modhe | [ˈmoᶑe] | good |
| k͡𝼊 q͡𝼊 ɡ͡𝼊 ɢ͡𝼊 ŋ͡𝼊 ɴ͡𝼊 | retroflex clicks | Central !Kung | ɡ‼ú | [ᶢ𝼊ú] | water |

Retroflex allophones of vowels adjacent to retroflex consonants may also be written with a hook. Unicode characters are ⟨ᶖ 𝼚 ᶙ ᶒ ᶕ 𝼛 ᶓ ᶔ ᶗ ᶏ ᶐ⟩. Several of these are from an old IPA convention of using the retroflex hook for rhotic vowels.

=== Other conventions ===
Some linguists restrict these symbols for consonants with subapical palatal articulation, in which the tongue is curled back and contacts the hard palate, and use the alveolar symbols with the obsolete IPA underdot symbol for an apical post-alveolar articulation: ⟨ṭ, ḍ, ṇ, ṣ, ẓ, ḷ, ɾ̣, ɹ̣⟩, and use ⟨ᶘ, ᶚ⟩ for laminal retroflex, as in Polish and Russian. The latter are also often transcribed with a retraction diacritic, as ⟨s̠⟩. Otherwise they are typically but inaccurately transcribed as if they were palato-alveolar, as ⟨ʃ⟩.

Consonants with more forward articulation, in which the tongue touches the alveolar or postalveolar region rather than the hard palate, can be indicated with the retracted diacritic (minus sign below). This occurs especially for [s̠ ẕ]; other sounds indicated this way, such as ⟨ṉ ḻ ḏ⟩, tend to refer to alveolo-palatal rather than retroflex consonants.

== Occurrence ==
Although data are not precise, about 20 percent of the world's languages contain retroflex consonants of one sort or another. About half of these possess only retroflex continuants, with most of the rest having both stops and continuants.

Retroflex consonants are concentrated in the Indian subcontinent, particularly in the Indo-Aryan and Dravidian languages, but are found in other languages of the region as well, such as the Austroasiatic Munda languages, isolates Burushaski, Nihali, Vedda, languages of the Andaman and Nicobars like Akajeru, Jarawa, Car Nicobarese, and Sino-Tibetan Dzongkha.

The Nuristani languages of eastern Afghanistan also have retroflex consonants. Among Eastern Iranian languages, they are common in Pashto, Wakhi, Sanglechi-Ishkashimi, and Munji-Yidgha, along with Western Iranian languages such as Balochi. They also occur in some other Asian languages such as Sino-Tibetan Mandarin Chinese, Miji and Nuosu, Austronesian Javanese, Iaai and Rukai, Uralic Khanty languages, Austroasiatic Vietnamese, Mongolic Dongxiang, Hmong-Mien Hmong. Korean and Japonic Miyakoan have an allophonic retroflex lateral. Kagoshima Japanese has a /ɽ/. In West Asia, the Shihhi Arabic variety also has a retroflex rhotic.

The other major concentration is in the indigenous languages of Australia and the Western Pacific (notably New Caledonia). Here, most languages have retroflex plosives, nasals and approximants.

Retroflex consonants are relatively rare in the European languages but occur in such languages as Swedish, Norwegian and Faroese in Northern Europe, some Romance languages of Southern Europe (Sardinian, Sicilian, including Calabrian and Salentino, Venetian, some Italian dialects such as Lunigianese in Italy, and some Asturian dialects in Spain), and (sibilants only) several Slavic languages (Polish, Russian, Serbo-Croatian, Slovak and Sorbian). In Swedish and Norwegian, a sequence of r and a coronal consonant may be replaced by the coronal's retroflex equivalent: the name Martin is pronounced [ˈmǎʈːɪn] (Swedish) or [ˈmɑ̀ʈːɪn] (Norwegian), and nord ("north") is pronounced [ˈnuːɖ] in (Standard) Swedish and [ˈnuːɽ] in many varieties of Norwegian. That is sometimes done for several consonants in a row after an r: Hornstull is pronounced [huːɳʂˈʈɵlː]).

The retroflex approximant [ɻ] is present in some dialects of Brazilian Portuguese and is in free variation with the postalveolar approximant /ɹ/ in many dialects of American English, particularly in the Midwestern United States. Polish and Russian possess retroflex sibilants, but no stops or liquids at this place of articulation.

Retroflex consonants are largely absent from indigenous languages of the Americas with the exception of the extreme south of South America, an area in the Southwestern United States as in Hopi and O'odham, and in Alaska and the Yukon Territory as in the Athabaskan languages Gwich’in and Hän. In African languages retroflex consonants are also rare but reportedly occur in a few Nilo-Saharan languages, as well as in the Bantu language Makhuwa and some other varieties. In southwest Ethiopia, phonemically distinctive retroflex consonants are found in Bench and Sheko, two contiguous, but not closely related, Omotic languages.

There are several retroflex consonants that are implied by the International Phonetic Association. In their Handbook, they give the example of [ᶑ], a retroflex implosive, but when they requested an expansion of coverage of the International Phonetic Alphabet by Unicode in 2020, they supported the addition superscript variants of not just [ᶑ] but of the retroflex lateral fricatives [ꞎ] and [𝼅], of the retroflex lateral flap [𝼈], and of the retroflex click release [𝼊]. (See Latin Extended-F.) The lateral fricatives are explicitly provided for by extIPA.

Most of these sounds are not common, but they all occur. For example, the Iwaidja language of northern Australia has a retroflex lateral flap [𝼈] ([ɺ̢]) as well as a retroflex tap [ɽ] and retroflex lateral approximant [ɭ]; and the Dravidian language Toda has a subapical retroflex lateral fricative [ꞎ] ([ɭ̊˔]) and a retroflexed trill [ɽr]. The Ngad'a language of Flores has been reported to have a retroflex implosive [ᶑ]. Subapical retroflex clicks occur in Central !Kung, and possibly in Damin.

Most languages with retroflex sounds typically have only one retroflex sound with a given manner of articulation. An exception, however, is the Toda language, with a two-way distinction among retroflex sibilants between apical (post)alveolar and subapical palatal.

== See also ==
- Hush consonant
- List of phonetics topics
- Place of articulation
- Retroflex approximant

== Notes ==
| Place → | Labial | | | | | Coronal | | | | | | | | | | Dorsal | | | | | Laryngeal | | | |
| Manner ↓ | Bilabial | | Labiodental | | Linguolabial | | Dental | | Alveolar | | Postalveolar | | Retroflex | | (Alveolo-)palatal | | Velar | | Uvular | | Pharyngeal/epiglottal | | Glottal | |
|---|---|---|---|---|---|---|---|---|---|---|---|---|---|---|---|---|---|---|---|---|---|---|---|---|
| Nasal | m̥ | m | ɱ̊ | ɱ | | n̼ | n̪̊ | n̪ | n̥ | n | n̠̊ | n̠ | ɳ̊ | ɳ | ɲ̊ | ɲ | ŋ̊ | ŋ | ɴ̥ | ɴ | | | | |
| Plosive | p | b | p̪ | b̪ | t̼ | d̼ | t̪ | d̪ | t | d | | | ʈ | ɖ | c | ɟ | k | ɡ | q | ɢ | ʡ | | ʔ | |
| Sibilant affricate | | | | | | | t̪s̪ | d̪z̪ | ts | dz | t̠ʃ | d̠ʒ | tʂ | dʐ | tɕ | dʑ | | | | | | | | |
| Non-sibilant affricate | pɸ | bβ | p̪f | b̪v | | | t̪θ | d̪ð | tɹ̝̊ | dɹ̝ | t̠ɹ̠̊˔ | d̠ɹ̠˔ | | | cç | ɟʝ | kx | ɡɣ | qχ | ɢʁ | ʡʜ | ʡʢ | ʔh | |
| Sibilant fricative | | | | | | | s̪ | z̪ | s | z | ʃ | ʒ | ʂ | ʐ | ɕ | ʑ | | | | | | | | |
| Non-sibilant fricative | ɸ | β | f | v | θ̼ | ð̼ | θ | ð | θ̠ | ð̠ | ɹ̠̊˔ | ɹ̠˔ | ɻ̊˔ | ɻ˔ | ç | ʝ | x | ɣ | χ | ʁ | ħ | ʕ | h | ɦ |
| Approximant | | β̞ | | ʋ | | | | ð̞ | | ɹ | | ɹ̠ | | ɻ | | j | | ɰ | | | | | | ˷ |
| Tap/flap | | ⱱ̟ | | ⱱ | | | | | ɾ̥ | ɾ | | | ɽ̊ | ɽ | | | | | | ɢ̆ | | ʡ̆ | | |
| Trill | ʙ̥ | ʙ | | | | | | | r̥ | r | | r̠ | ɽ̊r̥ | ɽr | | | | | ʀ̥ | ʀ | ʜ | ʢ | | |
| Lateral affricate | | | | | | | | | tɬ | dɮ | | | tꞎ | d𝼅 | c𝼆 | ɟʎ̝ | k𝼄 | ɡʟ̝ | | | | | | |
| Lateral fricative | | | | | | | ɬ̪ | | ɬ | ɮ | | | ꞎ | 𝼅 | 𝼆 | ʎ̝ | 𝼄 | ʟ̝ | | | | | | |
| Lateral approximant | | | | | | | | l̪ | l̥ | l | | l̠ | ɭ̊ | ɭ | ʎ̥ | ʎ | ʟ̥ | ʟ | | ʟ̠ | | | | |
| Lateral tap/flap | | | | | | | | | ɺ̥ | ɺ | | | 𝼈̊ | 𝼈 | | ʎ̆ | | ʟ̆ | | | | | | |

| | | BL | LD | D | A | PA | RF | P | V | U |
|---|---|---|---|---|---|---|---|---|---|---|
| Implosive | Voiced | ɓ | | | ɗ | | ᶑ | ʄ | ɠ | ʛ |
| Implosive | Voiceless | ɓ̥ | | | ɗ̥ | | ᶑ̊ | ʄ̊ | ɠ̊ | ʛ̥ |
| Ejective | Stop | pʼ | | | tʼ | | ʈʼ | cʼ | kʼ | qʼ |
| Ejective | Affricate | | p̪fʼ | tθʼ | tsʼ | tʃʼ | tʂʼ | tɕʼ | kxʼ | qχʼ |
| Ejective | Fricative | ɸʼ | fʼ | θʼ | sʼ | ʃʼ | ʂʼ | ɕʼ | xʼ | χʼ |
| Ejective | Lateral affricate | | | | tɬʼ | | | c𝼆ʼ | k𝼄ʼ | q𝼄ʼ |
| Ejective | Lateral fricative | | | | ɬʼ | | | | | |
| Click (top: velar; bottom: uvular) | Tenuis | kʘ qʘ | | kǀ qǀ | kǃ qǃ | | k𝼊 q𝼊 | kǂ qǂ | | |
| Click (top: velar; bottom: uvular) | Voiced | ɡʘ ɢʘ | | ɡǀ ɢǀ | ɡǃ ɢǃ | | ɡ𝼊 ɢ𝼊 | ɡǂ ɢǂ | | |
| Click (top: velar; bottom: uvular) | Nasal | ŋʘ ɴʘ | | ŋǀ ɴǀ | ŋǃ ɴǃ | | ŋ𝼊 ɴ𝼊 | ŋǂ ɴǂ | ʞ | |
| Click (top: velar; bottom: uvular) | Tenuis lateral | | | | kǁ qǁ | | | | | |
| Click (top: velar; bottom: uvular) | Voiced lateral | | | | ɡǁ ɢǁ | | | | | |
| Click (top: velar; bottom: uvular) | Nasal lateral | | | | ŋǁ ɴǁ | | | | | |
