= Airstream mechanism =

Method by which airflow is created in the vocal tract

In phonetics, the airstream mechanism is the method by which airflow is created in the vocal tract. Along with phonation and articulation, it is one of three main components of speech production. The airstream mechanism is mandatory for most sound production and constitutes the first part of this process, which is called initiation.

The organ generating the airstream is called the initiator and there are three initiators used phonemically in non-disordered human oral languages:

- the diaphragm together with the ribs and lungs (pulmonic mechanisms),
- the glottis (glottalic mechanisms), and
- the tongue (lingual or "velaric" mechanisms).

There are also methods of making sounds that do not require the glottis. These mechanisms are collectively called alaryngeal speech mechanisms (none of these speech mechanisms are used in non-disordered speech):

- the cheeks (buccal mechanisms, notated {ↀ} in VoQS). See buccal speech.
- after a laryngectomy, the esophagus may be used (notated {Œ} for simple esophageal speech, {Ю} for tracheo-esophageal speech in VoQS, and notated {И} for electrolaryngeal speech). See esophageal speech.
- the pharynx, and replacing the glottis using the tongue and the upper alveolus, the palate, or the pharyngeal wall. See pharyngeal speech.

Percussive consonants are produced without any airstream mechanism.

== Types of airstream mechanism ==
Any of the three principal initiators − diaphragm, glottis or tongue − may act by either increasing or decreasing the pressure generating the airstream. These changes in pressure often correspond to outward and inward airflow, and are therefore termed egressive and ingressive respectively.

Of these six resulting airstream mechanisms, four are found lexically around the world, alongside the percussive sounds produced without an airstream mechanism, for a total of five:

- pulmonic egressive, where the air is pushed out of the lungs by the ribs and diaphragm. All human languages employ such sounds (such as /b/), and nearly three out of four use them exclusively.
- glottalic egressive, where the air column is compressed as the glottis moves upward. Such consonants are called ejectives. Ejective and ejective-like consonants occur in 16% of the languages.
- glottalic ingressive, where the air column is rarefied as the glottis moves downward. Such consonants are called implosives. Implosive and implosive-like consonants occur in 13% of the world's languages. Despite the name, the airstream may not actually flow inward: While the glottis moves downward, pulmonic air passes outward through it, but the reduction in pressure makes an audible difference to the sound.
- lingual ingressive, AKA velaric ingressive, where the air in the mouth is rarefied by a downward and sometimes rearward movement of the tongue. These are the click consonants. Clicks are regular sounds in ordinary (i.e. lexical) words in fewer than 2% of the world's languages, all in Africa.
- percussive, where two organs are struck against each other. No standalone percussive occurs in any language, but alveolar clicks may have a sublingual percussive release in Sandawe, where after the click is pronounced, the tongue strikes the floor of the mouth.

That leaves pulmonic ingressive and lingual (velaric) egressive as the only two airstream mechanisms produced by the three main initiators that are not found lexically in the world.

These mechanisms may be combined into airstream contours, such as clicks which release into ejectives.

In normal vocabulary, the various Khoisan languages have pulmonic, ejective, and click consonants; the Chadic languages, some Mayan languages, and scattered Nilo-Saharan languages such as Gumuz, Uduk and Meʼen have pulmonic, implosive, and ejective consonants, and the Nguni languages of the Bantu family utilize all four, – pulmonic, click, implosive, and ejective, – as does the Dahalo language of Kenya. Most other languages utilize at most two airstream mechanisms.

In interjections, the other two mechanisms may be employed. For example, in countries as diverse as Sweden, Turkey, and Togo, a pulmonic ingressive ("gasped" or "inhaled") vowel is used for back-channeling or to express agreement, and in France a lingual egressive (a "spurt") is used to express dismissal. The only language where such sounds are known to be contrastive in normal vocabulary is the extinct ritual language Damin (also the only language outside Africa with clicks); however, Damin appears to have been intentionally designed to differ from normal speech.

== Pulmonic initiation ==
Initiation by means of the lungs (actually the diaphragm and ribs) is called pulmonic initiation. The vast majority of sounds used in human languages are pulmonic egressives. In most languages, including all the languages of Europe (excluding the Caucasus), all phonemes are pulmonic egressives.

The only attested use of a phonemic pulmonic ingressive is a lateral fricative in Damin, a ritual language formerly used by speakers of Lardil in Australia. This can be written with the extended version of the International Phonetic Alphabet as [ɬ↓ʔ]. !Xóõ has ingression as a phonetic detail in one series of its clicks, which are ingressive voiceless nasals with delayed aspiration, [↓ŋ̊ʘʰ ↓ŋ̊ǀʰ ↓ŋ̊ǁʰ ↓ŋ̊!ʰ ↓ŋ̊ǂʰ]. Peter Ladefoged considers these to be among the most difficult sounds in the world. Other languages, for example in Taiwan, have been claimed to have pulmonic ingressives, but these claims have either proven to be spurious or to be occasional phonetic detail.

In interjections, but not in normal words, pulmonic ingressive vowels or words occur on all continents. This is commonly done for back-channeling (as with [ə↓] in Ewe) or affirmation (as with [ɸʷ↓] in Swedish). In English, an audible intake of breath, [hːː↓], or an indrawn consonant such as [tʰ↓] or [p͡t↓] is used in a conversation to indicate that someone is about to speak or is preparing to continue speaking. In some languages, such as Finnish and Amharic, entire phrases may be uttered with an ingressive airstream. (See ingressive sound.)

== Glottalic initiation ==
It is possible to initiate airflow in the upper vocal tract by means of the vocal cords or glottis. This is known as glottalic initiation.

For egressive glottalic initiation, one lowers the glottis (as if to sing a low note), closes it as for a glottal stop, and then raises it, building up pressure in the oral cavity and upper trachea. Glottalic egressives are called ejectives. The glottis must be fully closed to form glottalic egressives, or the air column would flow backwards over it; it is therefore impossible to pronounce voiced ejectives. Ejective allophones of voiceless stops occur in many varieties of English at the ends of intonation units.

For ingressive glottalic initiation, the sequence of actions performed in glottalic pressure initiation is reversed: one raises the glottis (as if to sing a high note), closes it, and then lowers it to create suction in the upper trachea and oral cavity. Glottalic ingressives are called implosives, although they may involve zero airflow rather than actual inflow. Because the air column would flow forwards over the descending glottis, it is not necessary to fully close it, and implosives may be voiced; indeed, voiceless implosives are exceedingly rare.

It is usual for implosives to be voiced. Instead of keeping the glottis tightly closed, it is tensed but left slightly open to allow a thin stream of air through. Unlike pulmonic voiced sounds, in which a stream of air passes through a usually-fixed glottis, in voiced implosives a mobile glottis passes over a nearly motionless air column to cause vibration of the vocal cords. Phonations that are more open than modal voice, such as breathy voice, are not conducive to glottalic sounds because in these the glottis is held relatively open, allowing air to readily flow through and preventing a significant pressure difference from building up behind the articulator.

Because the oral cavity is so much smaller than the lungs, vowels and approximants cannot be pronounced with glottalic initiation. So-called glottalized vowels and other sonorants use the more common pulmonic egressive airstream mechanism.

There is no clear divide between pulmonic and glottalic sounds. Some languages may have consonants which are intermediate. For example, glottalized consonants in London English, such as the t in rat [ˈɹæʔt], may be weakly ejective. Similarly, fully voiced stops in languages such as Thai, Zulu, and Maidu are weakly implosive. This ambiguity does not occur with the next airstream mechanism, lingual, which is clearly distinct from pulmonic sounds.

== Lingual (velaric) initiation ==
The third form of initiation in human language is lingual or velaric initiation, where a sound is produced by a closure at two places of articulation, and the airstream is formed by movement of the body of the tongue. Lingual stops are more commonly known as clicks, and are almost universally ingressive. The word lingual is derived from Latin lingua, which means tongue.

To produce a lingual ingressive airstream, first close the vocal tract at two places: at the back of the tongue, as in a velar or uvular stop, and simultaneously with the front of the tongue or the lips, as in a coronal or bilabial stop. These holds may be voiceless, voiced, or nasalized. Then lower the body of the tongue to rarefy the air above it. The closure at the front of the tongue is opened first, as the click "release"; then the closure at the back is released for the pulmonic or glottalic click "accompaniment" or "efflux". This may be aspirated, affricated, or even ejective. Even when not ejective, it is not uncommon for the glottis to be closed as well, for a triply articulated consonant, and this third closure is released last to produce a glottalized click. Clicks are found in very few languages, notably the Khoisan languages of southern Africa and some nearby tongues such as Zulu. They are more often found in extra-linguistic contexts, such as the "tsk tsk" sound many Westerners use to express regret or pity (a dental click), or the clucking noise used by many equestrians to urge on their horses (a lateral click).

Lingual egressive initiation is performed by reversing the sequence of a lingual ingressive: the front and back of the tongue (or lips and back of the tongue) seal off the vocal cavity, and the cheeks and middle of the tongue move inward and upward to increase oral pressure. The only attested use of a lingual egressive is a bilabial egressive "spurt" in Damin. Transcribing this also requires the use of the Extended IPA, [ʘ↑].

Since the air pocket used to initiate lingual consonants is so small, it is not thought to be possible to produce lingual fricatives, vowels, or other sounds which require continuous airflow.

Clicks may be voiced, but they are more easily nasalized. This may be because the vocal cavity behind the rearmost closure, behind which the air passing through the glottis for voicing must be contained, is so small that clicks cannot be voiced for long. Allowing the airstream to pass through the nose enables a longer production.

Nasal clicks involve a combination of lingual and pulmonic mechanisms. The velum is lowered so as to direct pulmonic airflow through the nasal cavity during the lingual initiation. This nasal airflow may itself be egressive or ingressive, independently of the lingual initiation of the click. Nasal clicks may be voiced, but are very commonly unvoiced and even aspirated, which is rare for purely pulmonic nasals.

== Airstream contours ==
In some treatments, complex clicks are posited to have airstream contours, in which the airstream changes between the front (click) and rear (non-click) release. There are two attested types: Linguo-pulmonic consonants, where the rear release is a uvular obstruent such as [q] or [χ]; and linguo-glottalic consonants, where the rear release is an ejective such as [qʼ] or [qχʼ].

Not only are simultaneous (rather than contour) implosive clicks possible, i.e. velar (e.g. [ɠ͡ǀ]), uvular ([ʛ͡ǀ]), and de facto front-closed palatal ([ʄ͡ǀ]), but velar implosive clicks are easier to produce than modally voiced clicks. However, they are not attested in any language.

== Percussive consonants ==
Consonants may be pronounced without any airstream mechanism. These are a subset of percussive consonants, where sound is generated by one speech organ striking another. Purely percussive consonants – that is, those without any airstream mechanism – are not phonemic in any known language, though the extensions to the IPA for disordered speech provide symbols for a bilabial percussive [ʬ] (a smack of the lips), a bidental percussive [ʭ] (a gnashing or clashing of the teeth), and a sublaminal (sublingual) lower-alveolar percussive [¡] (a tongue slap). The only percussive confirmed to be used in normal speech is a tongue slap that appears allophonically in the release of alveolar clicks in the Sandawe language of Tanzania. (See Alveolar click § Percussive release and Palatal click § Percussive release.) There is also a speech register in Pirahã in which the tongue is released from a lateral flap [ɺ] to make a sublaminal strike of the lower lip [¡᫥]. (See labiolingual consonant.)

Percussive consonants
Bilabial	Bidental	Sublingual
ʬ	ʭ	¡

Tap and flap consonants in general are described as percussive sounds, but in an articulatory sense; the airstream mechanism is still pulmonic because the sound is generated by a (percussive) interruption of a pulmonic airflow. The abrupt releases of other pulmonic consonants have also been described as percussive, for example the audible velar release often heard in a velar nasal before a vowel, [ŋᶢ].

== See also ==
- Index of phonetics articles
- Manner of articulation
