= Laminal consonant =

Phone (speech sound)

Laminal

◌̻

◌᫤
- IPA number: 410

Encoding
- Entity (decimal): &#827;&#6884;
- Unicode (hex): U+033B U+1AE4
Image

Schematic linguograms of 1) apical, 2) upper apical, 3) laminal and 4) apicolaminal stops based on Dart (1991:16), illustrating the areas of the tongue in contact with the palate during articulation (shown in grey)

A laminal consonant is a phone (speech sound) produced by obstructing the air passage with the blade of the tongue, the flat top front surface just behind the tip of the tongue, in contact with the upper lip, teeth, alveolar ridge, to possibly, as far back as the hard palate, although in the last contact may involve parts behind the blade as well. It is distinct from an apical consonant, produced by creating an obstruction with the tongue apex (tongue tip) only. Laminal is sometimes used exclusively for an articulation that involves only the blade of the tongue with the tip being lowered and apicolaminal for an articulation that involves both the blade of the tongue and the raised tongue tip. The distinction applies only to coronal consonants, which use the front of the tongue. If interpreted as coronal rather than dorsal, the term 'palatal' typically implies that a sound is laminal, with apical (as well as subapical) sounds distinguished as 'retroflex', though occasionally 'lamino-palatal' and 'apico-palatal' (or 'lamino-domal' and 'apico-domal') are seen.

== Places of articulation ==
		IPA symbol	meaning
place of articulation	passive (mouth)	⟨s̪⟩	dental
place of articulation	passive (mouth)	⟨s̟⟩	advanced (denti-alveolar)
place of articulation	passive (mouth)	⟨s͇⟩	alveolar
place of articulation	passive (mouth)	⟨s̠⟩	retracted (postalveolar)
place of articulation	active (tongue)	⟨s̺⟩	apical
place of articulation	active (tongue)	⟨s̻⟩	laminal
place of articulation	active (tongue)	⟨ʂ⟩	retroflex
place of articulation	secondary	⟨sʲ⟩	palatalized coronal
place of articulation	secondary	⟨ɕ⟩	alveolo-palatal
place of articulation	secondary	⟨ʃ⟩	palato-alveolar
place of articulation	secondary	⟨sʷ⟩	labialized coronal
place of articulation	secondary	⟨sˠ⟩	velarized coronal
place of articulation	secondary	⟨sˤ⟩	pharyngealized coronal
voice-onset time		⟨sʰ⟩	aspirated coronal

== Compared to apical ==
Some languages contrast laminal and apical sounds:

- The contrast is common in Australian Aboriginal languages, which usually have no fricatives.
- Some languages in South Asia contrast apical and laminal stops. In Hindustani, the apical stops are normally called "retroflex", but are really alveolar or postalveolar. Malayalam has a three-way distinction between laminal dental, apical alveolar and true subapical retroflex in nasal and voiceless oral stops.
- Basque and Mirandese differentiate between laminal and apical sibilants in the alveolar region; Mandarin Chinese, Serbo-Croatian, and Polish make such a distinction with postalveolar consonants.
- Some native languages of California have the distinction in both stops and fricatives.
- Dahalo makes the distinction only in its stops.

Since laminal consonants use the flat of the tongue, they cover a broader area of contact than apical consonants. Laminal consonants in some languages have been recorded with a broad occlusion (closure) that covers all the front of the mouth from the hard palate to the teeth, which makes it difficult to compare the two. Alveolar laminals and apicals are two different articulations.

A very common laminal articulation is sometimes called denti-alveolar. It spans the alveolar ridge to the teeth, but is a little further forward than other alveolar laminal consonants, which cover more of the alveolar ridge and might be considered postalveolar. This occurs in French.

== Compared to alveolar ==
Part of the confusion in naming laminal consonants is quite literally a matter of point of view. When one looks at a person pronouncing a laminal alveolar or denti-alveolar, the tip of the tongue can be seen touching the back of the teeth or even protruding between the teeth, which gives them the common name of dental.

Acoustically, however, the primary element is the place of the rearmost occlusion, which is the point that the resonant chamber in the mouth terminates. That determines the size, shape and acoustics of the oral cavity, which produces the harmonics of the vowels. Thus, French coronals are alveolar and differ from English alveolars primarily in being laminal rather than apical (in French, the tongue is flatter).

There are true laminal dentals in some languages with no alveolar contact, such as in Hindustani, which are different from French consonants. Nevertheless, the breadth of contact has some impact; it influences the shape of the tongue further back and so the shape of the resonant cavity. Also, if the release of a denti-alveolar consonant is not abrupt, the tongue may peel off from the roof of the mouth from back to front and shift from an alveolar to a dental pronunciation.

In the IPA, the diacritic for laminal consonants is a rectangle, normally placed under the letter: U+033B ◌̻ COMBINING SQUARE BELOW.

== See also ==
- Apical consonant
- Subapical consonant
- Coronal consonant
- Index of phonetics articles

== Bibliography ==
- Catford, J.C. (1977). Fundamental problems in phonetics. Bloomington: Indiana University Press.
- Gafos, Diamandis (1997). "A Cross-Sectional View of s, ʃ, θ". Proceedings of the North East Linguistics Society. 27.
- Dart, Sarah N. (1991). Articulatory and Acoustic Properties of Apical and Laminal Articulations. Working Papers in Phonetics. Vol. 79.
- Dart, Sarah N.; Nihalani, Paroo (1999). "The articulation of Malayalam coronal stops and nasals". Journal of the International Phonetic Association. 29 (2). Cambridge University Press: 129–142. doi:10.1017/S0025100300006502. JSTOR 44526241. S2CID 145638382.
- Ladefoged, Peter; Maddieson, Ian (1996). The Sounds of the World's Languages. Oxford: Blackwell. ISBN 0-631-19815-6.
