= Egressive sound =

Speech sound made by exhaling air

Egressive

↑◌
- IPA number: 662

Encoding
- Unicode (hex): U+2191
Image

In articulatory phonetics, egressive sounds (also known as exgressive sounds) are produced by an airstream mechanism that pushes air out through the mouth or nose. The three types of egressive sounds are pulmonic egressive (from the lungs), glottalic egressive (from the glottis), and lingual (velaric) egressive (from the tongue). The opposite of an egressive sound is an ingressive sound, in which the airstream flows inward through the mouth or nose.

== Types ==
=== Pulmonic ===
Pulmonic egressive sounds are those in which the air stream is created by the lungs, ribs, and diaphragm. The majority of sounds in most languages, including all those on the IPA vowel chart and main consonant chart, are both pulmonic and egressive. Pulmonic egressive sounds are found in all spoken languages.

=== Glottalic ===
Glottalic egressive sounds are known as ejectives.

=== Lingual ===
A lingual egressive, also known as velaric egressive, involves a double closure similar to that of the lingual ingressive sounds known as clicks, but with airflow in the opposite direction. With the velum closed, the speaker forces air out of the mouth using either the tongue or cheeks (though technically the latter would be buccal speech), as in the French expression of dismissal. While not known to be used for normal vocabulary in any human language, apart from the extinct Australian ritual language Damin (e.g. pʼnyurru [ʘ↑ɲuɾu] 'wife'), a variation of this airstream mechanism is known to musicians as part of circular breathing.
