= Subapical consonant =

Consonant sound made with underside of the tongue

A subapical consonant is a consonant made by contact with the underside of the tip of the tongue. The only common subapical articulations are in the postalveolar to palatal region, which are called "retroflex".

Most so-called retroflex consonants are more properly called apical. True subapical retroflexes are found in the Dravidian languages of Southern India.

Occasionally, the term sublaminal is used for subapical, which might be better used for sounds pronounced between the underside of the tongue and the floor of the mouth, such as sucking-teeth, or the percussive alveolar clicks of Sandawe and percussive palatal clicks of ǃKung.

== Bibliography ==
- Ladefoged, Peter; Maddieson, Ian (1996). The Sounds of the World's Languages. Oxford: Blackwell. ISBN 0-631-19815-6.
- Steever, Sanford B., ed. (2006). The Dravidian Languages (New ed.). Routledge. ISBN 978-0-415-41267-4.
