= Bullseye =

Bullseye or Bull's Eye may refer to:

== Symbols ==
- ◎ (Unicode U+25CE BULLSEYE), in the Geometric Shapes Unicode block
- ʘ (Unicode U+0298 LATIN LETTER BILABIAL CLICK), the phonetic symbol for bilabial click

== Animals and plants ==
- Bull's Eye, Euryops chrysanthemoides, a shrub
- Bullseye cardinalfish (disambiguation), several fish
- Bullseye coral, Caulastrea furcata
- Bullseye catfish, Horabagrus
- Bullseye electric ray, Diplobatis ommata, a fish
- Bullseye lichen, Placopsis, a fungus
- Bullseye puffer, Sphoeroides annulatus, a fish
- Bullseye round stingray, Urobatis concentricus, a fish
- Bullseye snakehead, Channa marulius, a fish
- Bullseye wriggler, Xenisthmus polyzonatus, a fish
- Longfinned bullseye or deepwater bullseye, Cookeolus japonicus, a fish
- Moontail bullseye, Priacanthus hamrur, a fish
- Shrubby bullseye, Gochnatia hypoleuca, a sunflower

== Architecture ==
- Bullseye, an alternative name for crown glass (window)
- Bull's eye, an oculus
- Oeil-de-boeuf, (French, 'bull's eye'), a small oval window

== Arts, entertainment, and media ==
=== Fictional entities ===
- Bullseye (Marvel Comics), an enemy of Daredevil in the Marvel Comics universe
- Bullseye (mascot), dog mascot of Target Corporation, which uses a bullseye symbol as its logo
- Bullseye, a Toy Story character
- Bull's Eye, a dog owned by Bill Sikes in Oliver Twist by Charles Dickens

=== Film ===
- Bull's Eye (serial), a 1917 American film serial
- Bullseye (1987 film), an Australian movie
- Bullseye! (1990 film), a British comedy

=== Music ===
- Bull's Eye! (album), a 1968 album by Barry Harris
- "Bullseye", a song by Aly & AJ from Insomniatic, 2007
- "Bull's Eye", a song by Nano, 2015

=== Television ===
- Bullseye (1980 American game show), hosted by Jim Lange (1980–1982)
- Bullseye (2015 American game show), hosted by Kellan Lutz and Godfrey
- Bullseye (British game show), hosted by Jim Bowen (1981–1995), Dave Spikey (2006) and Alan Carr (2020–2021)
- Bullseye (American TV program), American news program (2003–2005)
- "Bullseye" (American Horror Story), a 2014 episode
- "Bullseye" (The Avengers), a 1962 episode
- "Bullseye", a 2010 episode of Law & Order: Special Victims Unit (season 12)
- "Bullseye", pricing games from The Price Is Right
- "Bullseye!", an episode of season 3 of Phineas and Ferb
- Bullseye game, part of Family Feud TV game show
- Hugh S. "Bullseye" Forward, a character from COPS (animated TV series)

=== Other uses in arts and entertainment ===
- Bullseye with Jesse Thorn, an American public radio program and podcast
- Bullseye guitar, used by Eddie Ojeda
- Bull's Eyes, a 1961 story of Railway Series book "Branch Line Engines"
- Bullseye: Western Scout, a Mainline Publications comic

== Businesses and organisations ==
- Bullseye Glass, an American company
- Target Bullseye, the Target Corporation logo

== Places ==
- Bullseye Lake, Victoria Land, Antarctica
- Bullseye Mountain, Queen Elizabeth Range, Antarctica

== Ships ==
- Bull's eye, or deadeye, in sailing ship rigging
- Bull's-eye, a porthole window in a ship
- Herreshoff Bull's Eye, an American sailboat design

== Sports and games ==
- Bullseye (target), or bull's-eye, the centre of a target
- Bullseyes-Tokyo, an American football team from Japan
- Bull's-Eye Ball, a skee ball game

== Other uses ==
- Bull's Eye (postage stamp), an 1843 Brazilian stamp
- Bull's Eye, or Caramel Cream, a sweet by Goetze's Candy Company
- Bulls-eye (sweet), a spherical humbug
- Bull's-Eye Barbecue Sauce
- Bull's eye egg, sometimes meaning:
  - Fried egg, in India and Indonesia
  - Poached egg, in India
- Bull's-eye, a type of lantern
- Bullseye, a type of barcode
- Bullseye, a daily lottery game in Lotto New Zealand
  - Bullseye, the centre of a MaxiCode
- Bullseye, a slang terms for money
- Bullseye, or socked on the nose, a centred postmark in philately
- Bullseye, a swirled pattern on a tabby cat
- Bullseye rash, Erythema chronicum migrans, often seen in the early stage of Lyme disease
- Bullseye, the codename of version 11 of the Debian Linux operating system
- Bullseye (missile), a stealthy cruise missile from General Atomics

== See also ==
- Double Bullseye (disambiguation)
- Fisheye (disambiguation)
- Oxeye (disambiguation)
- Bull's eye level, a type of spirit level
- Bull's Eye Shooter Supply, a store implicated in the 2002 D.C. sniper attacks
- Chloroquine retinopathy, also known as Bull's eye maculopathy
- Circled dot (disambiguation)
- Fresnel lens
