= Black oreo =

Scientific classification
- Kingdom: Animalia
- Phylum: Chordata
- Class: Actinopterygii
- Order: Zeiformes
- Family: Oreosomatidae
- Genus: Allocyttus
- Species: A. niger

Binomial name
- Allocyttus niger G. D. James, Inada & I. Nakamura, 1988

Species of fish

The black oreo (Allocyttus niger) is an oreo of the family Oreosomatidae, found around Australia and New Zealand between latitudes of between 43°S and 55°S at depths of between 560 and 1,300 m.

== Size ==
This species reaches a length of 17.3 cm (6.8 in).

The black oreo is very similar in shape to the warty oreo.
