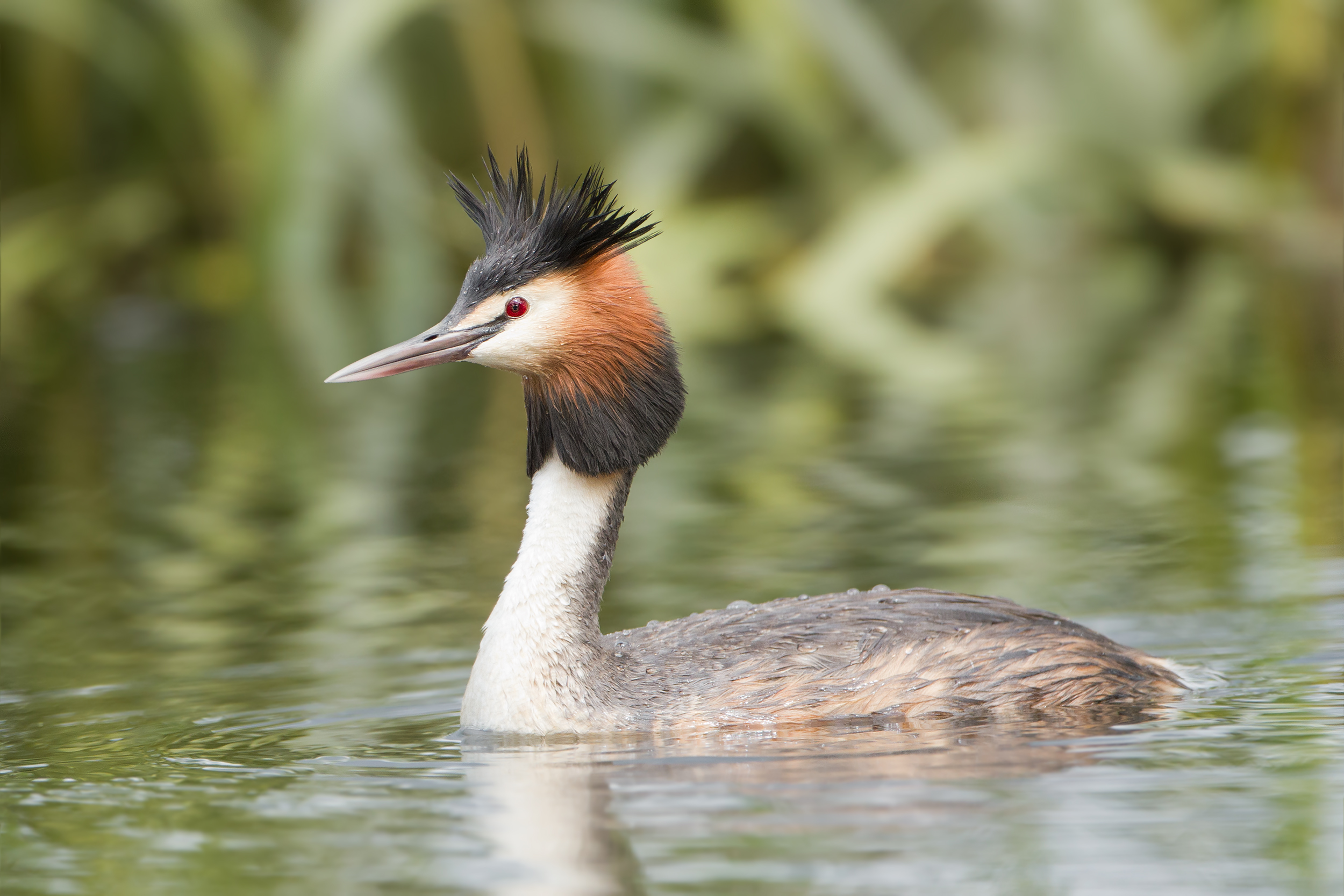
- P. c. australis in Tasmania

Conservation status
- Least Concern (IUCN 3.1)

Scientific classification
- Kingdom: Animalia
- Phylum: Chordata
- Class: Aves
- Order: Podicipediformes
- Family: Podicipedidae
- Genus: Podiceps
- Species: P. cristatus

Binomial name
- Podiceps cristatus (Linnaeus, 1758)
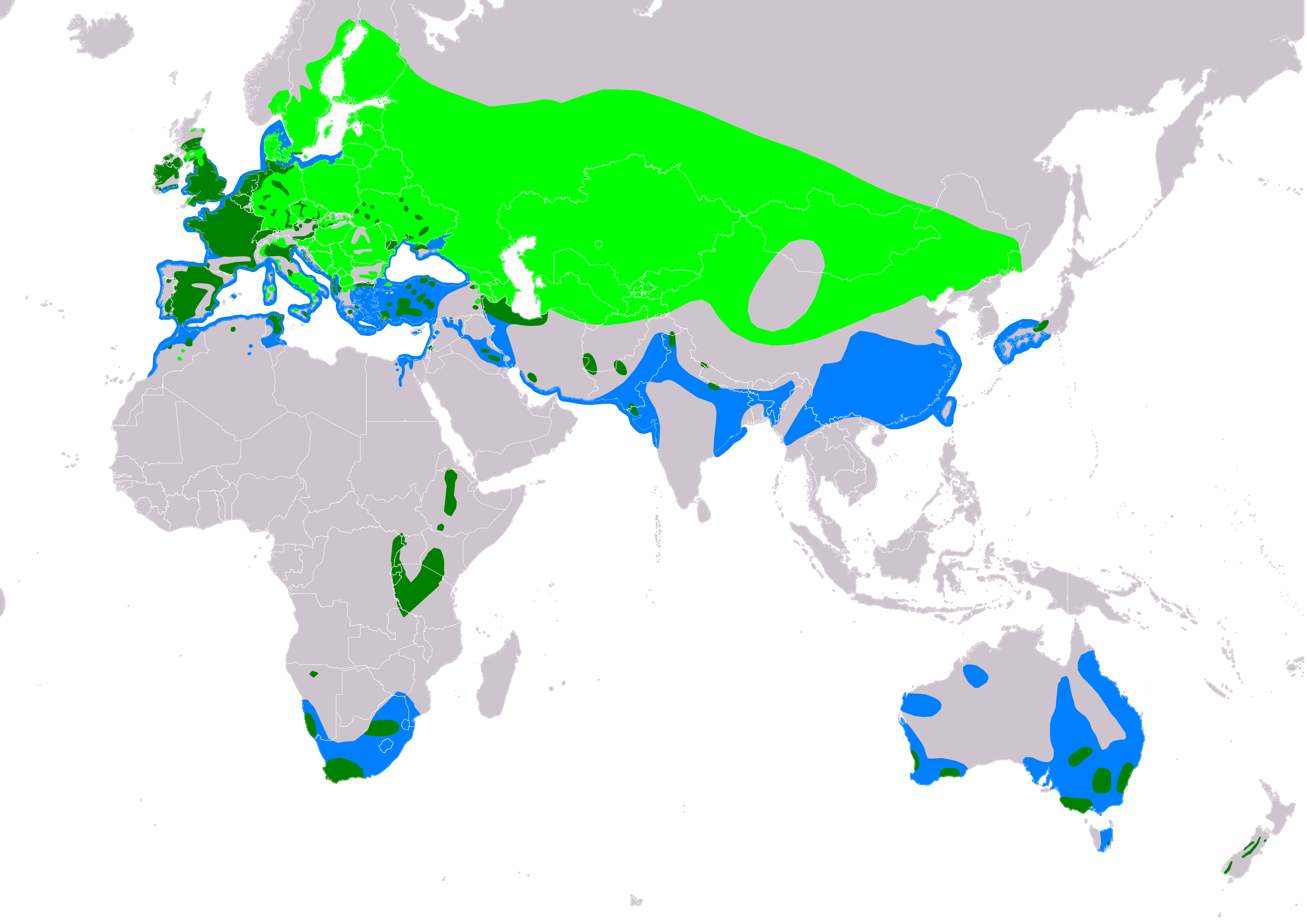
- Range of P. cristatus Breeding Resident Non-breeding

Synonyms
- Colymbus cristatus Linnaeus, 1758

Audio
- Call of P. c. cristatus recorded in Surrey, England

= Great crested grebe =

Species of bird

The great crested grebe (Podiceps cristatus) is a member of the grebe family of water birds. The bird is characterised by its distinctive appearance, featuring striking black, orange-brown, and white plumage, and elaborate courtship display that involves synchronised dances and displays.

== Taxonomy ==
The great crested grebe was formally described by the Swedish naturalist Carl Linnaeus in 1758 in the tenth edition of his Systema Naturae under the binomial name Colymbus cristatus. It is now the type species of the genus Podiceps that was erected by the English naturalist John Latham in 1787. The type locality is Sweden. The scientific name comes from Latin: the genus name Podiceps is from podicis, "vent" and pes, "foot", and is a reference to the placement of a grebe's legs towards the rear of its body; the specific name, cristatus, means "crested".

=== Subspecies ===
Three subspecies are currently accepted:

Summer	Winter	Scientific name	Distribution	Notes
Aiguamolls de l'Empordà, Catalonia, Spain	Nagoya, Aichi Prefecture, Japan	P. c. cristatus (Linnaeus, 1758)	Eurasia, from Ireland and Portugal east to Japan, and northernmost Africa	Nominate subspecies.
Bloubergstrand, Cape Town, South Africa	Paardevlei, Cape Town, South Africa	P. c. infuscatus Salvadori, 1884	Eastern and southern Africa from Ethiopia to South Africa; resident	Reduced or no white in front of eye compared to nominate subspecies.
Penrith, New South Wales, Australia	Colac, Victoria, Australia	P. c. australis Gould, 1844	Australia, Tasmania, South Island of New Zealand; resident or nomadic with water availability	Similar to nominate subspecies in plumage but slightly darker. Known as Australasian crested grebe and, in Māori, pūteketeke.

== Description ==
Video of bird returning to its nest, Slovakia

The great crested grebe is the largest species of grebe in the Old World, though some larger species occur in the Americas. They measure 46–51 cm (18–20 in) long with a 59–73 cm (23–29 in) wingspan and weigh 0.9 to 1.5 kg (2.0 to 3.3 lb). It is an excellent swimmer and diver, and pursues its fish prey underwater. The adults are unmistakable in summer with head and neck decorations. In winter they have white above the eye and a pink bill. Birds resident in warmer tropical and subtropical regions (particularly in subspecies P. c. infuscatus and P. c. australis) such as Kenya and parts of Australia retain breeding plumage all or almost all of the year, with reduced or no winter plumage.

The call is a loud barking rah-rah-rah. They can also produce a clicking kek call, and deep growls.

The chicks, like most grebe chicks, have boldly striped heads, with alternating black and white stripes; they are often colloquially called "humbugs" from their resemblance to humbug sweets. They lose these markings as they mature during their first winter.

== Distribution ==
The great crested grebe breeds in vegetated areas of freshwater lakes. The subspecies P. c. cristatus is found across Europe and east across the Palearctic. It is resident in the milder west of its range, but migrates from the colder regions. It winters on freshwater lakes and reservoirs or the coast. The African subspecies P. c. infuscatus and the Australasian subspecies P. c. australis are mainly sedentary.

== Behaviour ==
=== Breeding ===
The great crested grebe has an elaborate mating display. Like all grebes, it nests on the water's edge. The nest is built by both sexes. The clutch averages four chalky-white eggs which average 54 mm × 37 mm (2.1 in × 1.5 in) in size and 42 g (1.5 oz) in weight. Incubation is by both parents and begins as soon as the first egg is laid. The eggs hatch asynchronously after 27 to 29 days. The precocial young are cared for and fed by both parents.

Young grebes are capable of swimming and diving almost at hatching. The adults teach these skills to their young by carrying them on their back and diving, leaving the chicks to float on the surface; they then re-emerge a few feet away so that the chicks may swim back onto them.

=== Feeding ===
The great crested grebe feeds mainly on fish, but also small crustaceans, insects, small frogs and newts.

== Relationship to humans ==
A great crested grebe head in the coat of arms of Kauvatsa, Finland

This species was hunted almost to extinction in the United Kingdom in the 19th century for its head plumes, which were used to decorate ladies' hats and garments. The Royal Society for the Protection of Birds was set up to help protect this species, which is again a common sight.

The great crested grebe and its behaviour was the subject of one of the landmark publications in avian ethology, Julian Huxley's 1914 paper on "The Courtship‐habits of the Great Crested Grebe (Podiceps cristatus)".

Conservation efforts have been taking place on New Zealand's Lake Wānaka since 2013.

In November 2023, the comedian John Oliver highlighted New Zealand's Bird of the Year campaign in a Last Week Tonight episode and declared himself the "campaign manager" for the bird, which is also known in New Zealand by its Māori name pūteketeke. The bird was announced as the winner of the competition with the alliteration "Pūteketeke pandemonium prevails".

== Gallery ==
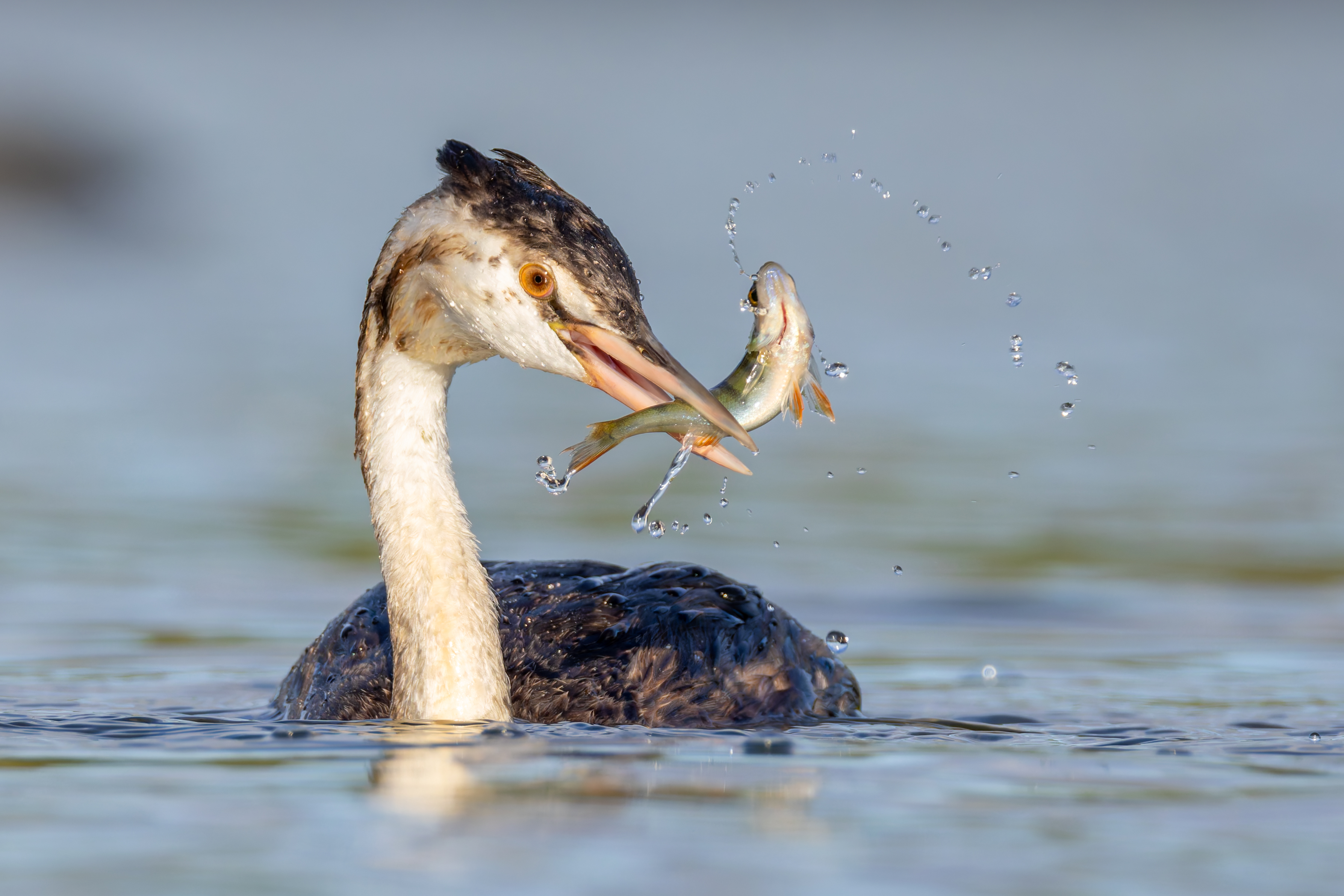
Immature great crested grebe holding a caught European perch, La Courneuve, France

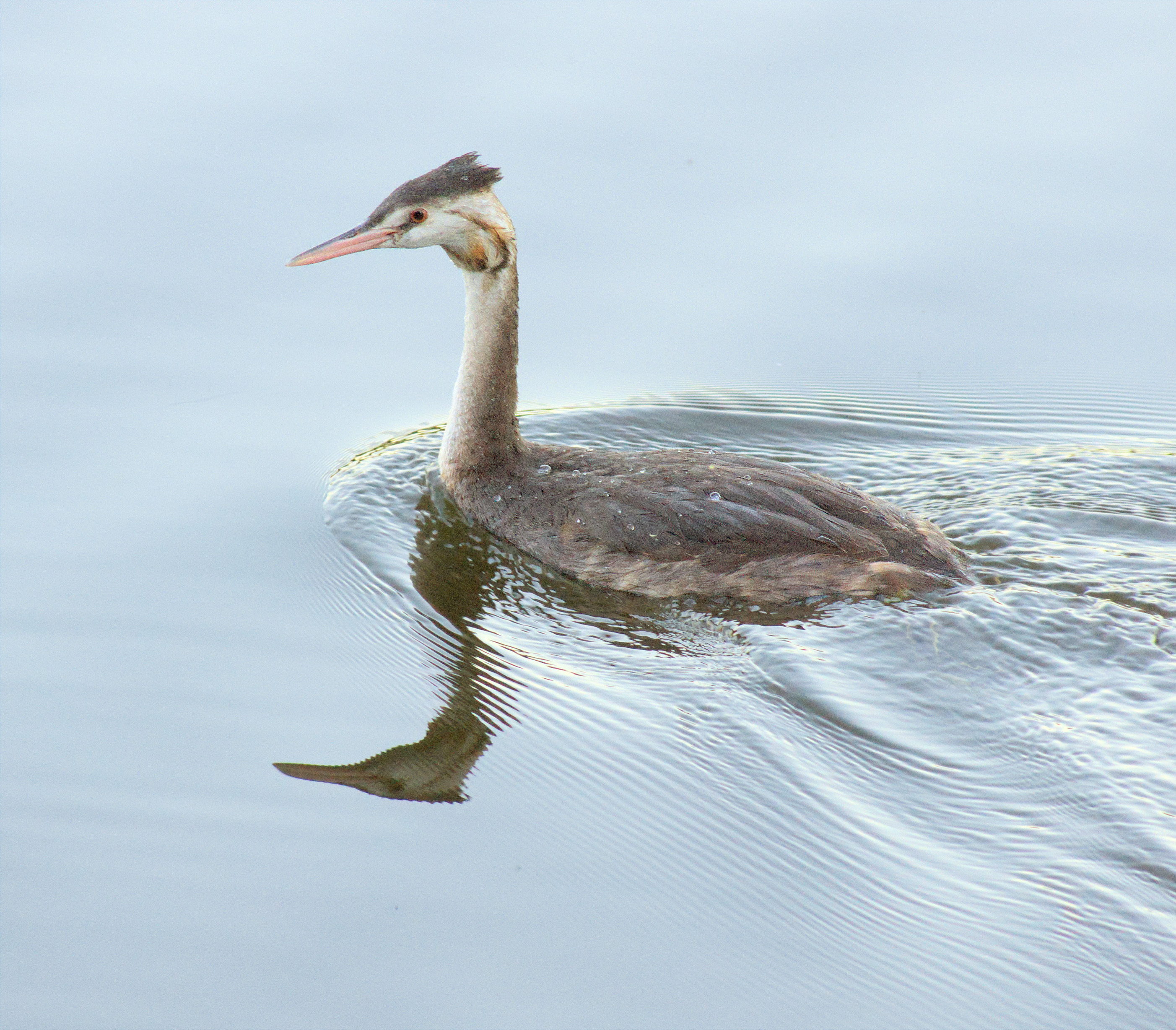
First-winter in autumn with traces of juvenile stripes remaining; Moscow

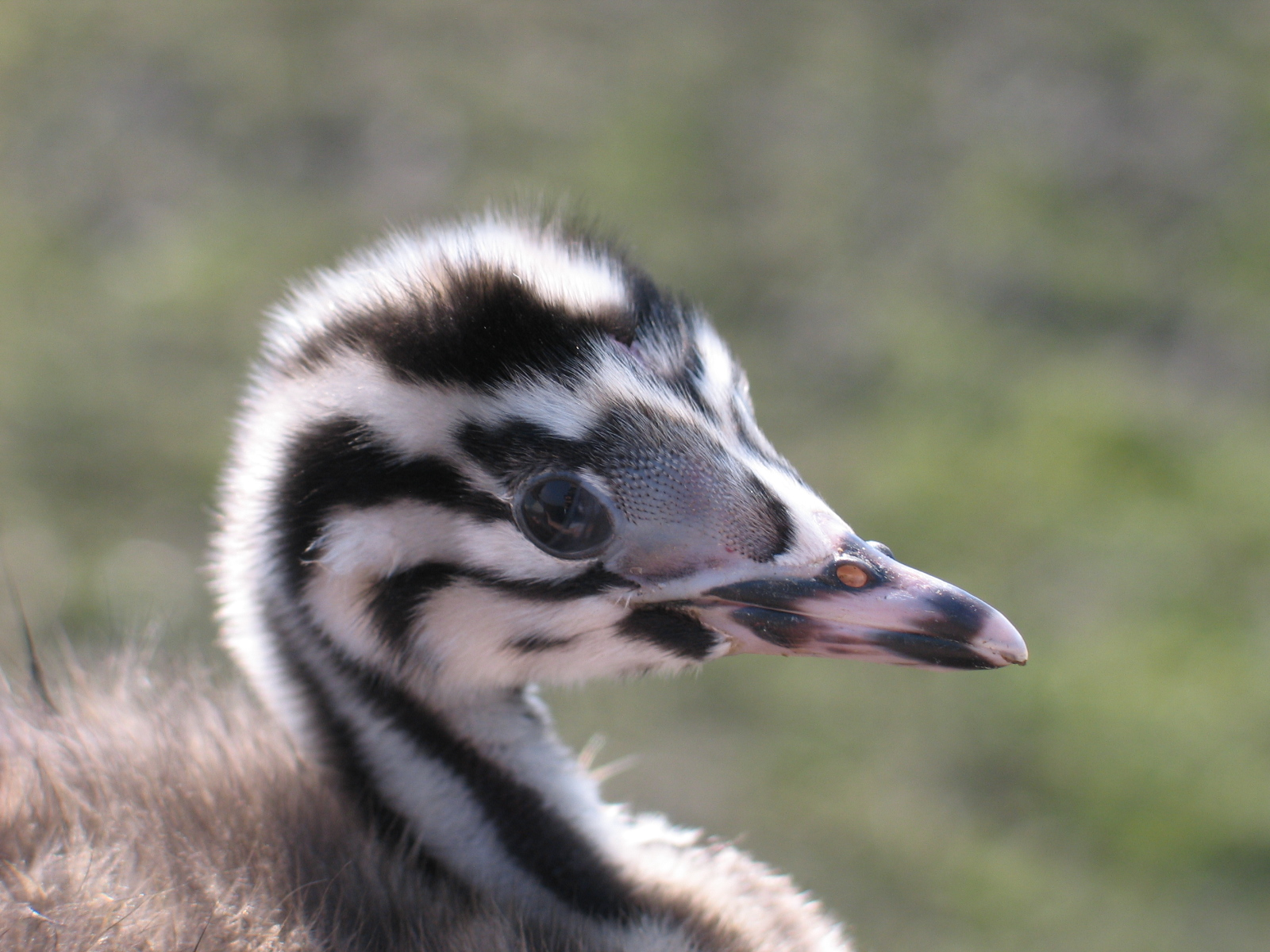
Head of juvenile with characteristic 'humbug' stripes

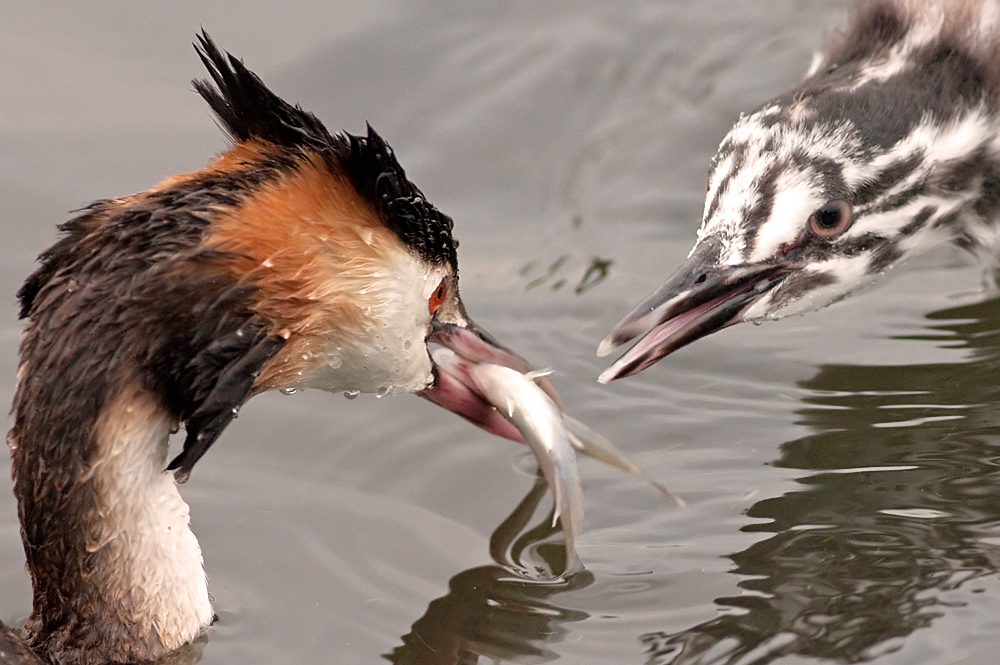
Adult ready to feed its young in Scotland

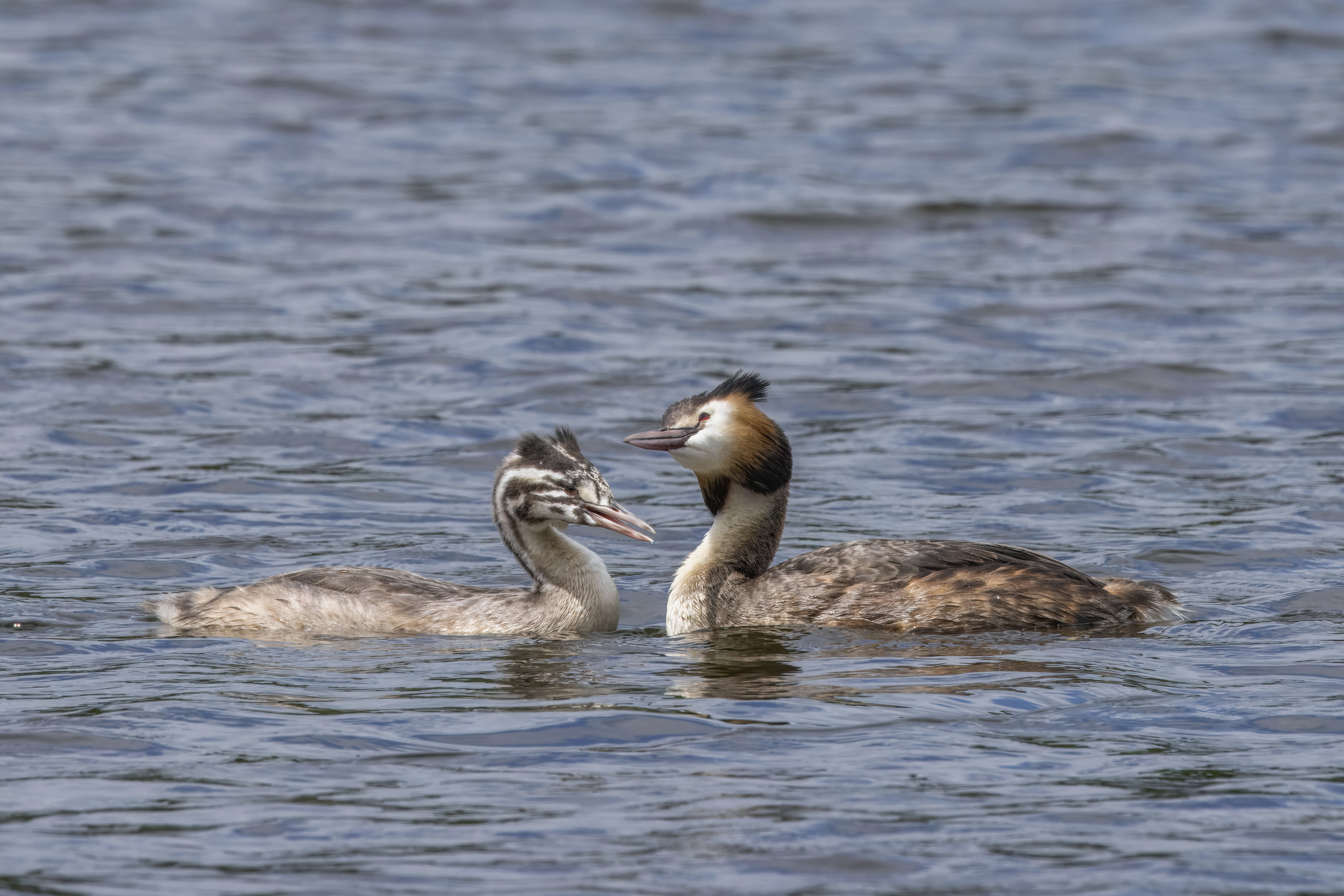
juvenile with adult in Luxembourg

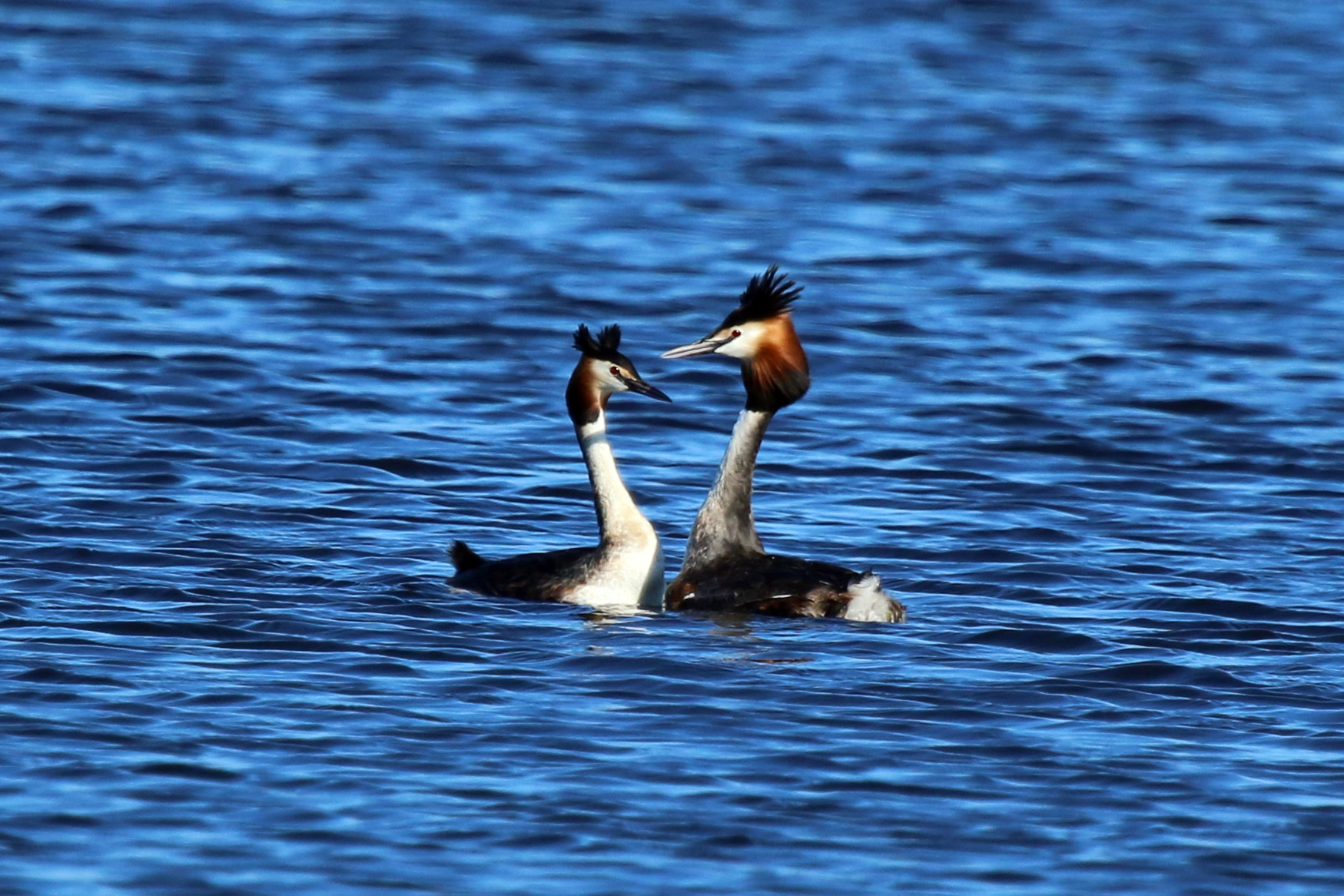
Mating ritual, Otmoor, Oxfordshire

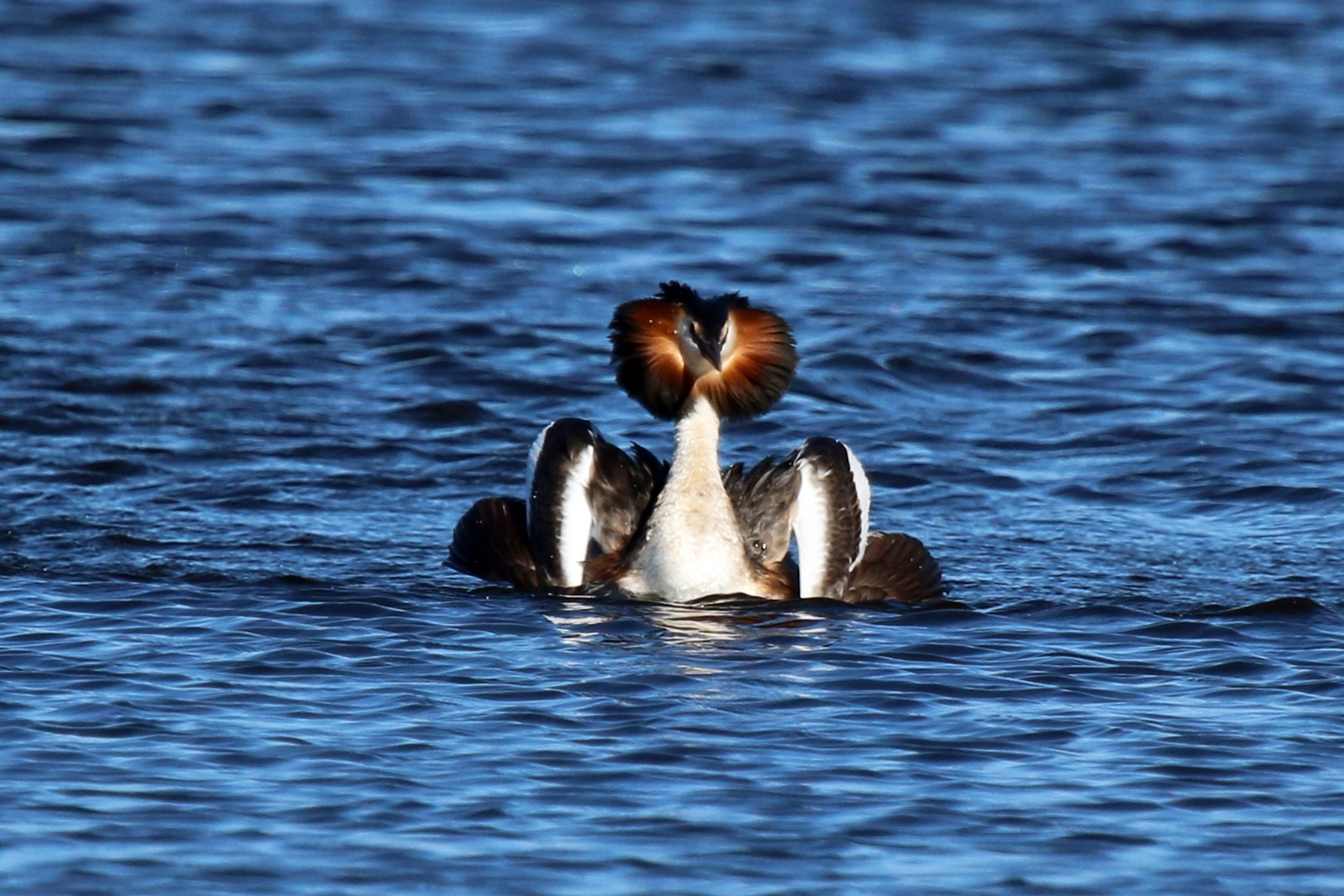
Male displaying during mating ritual, Otmoor, Oxfordshire

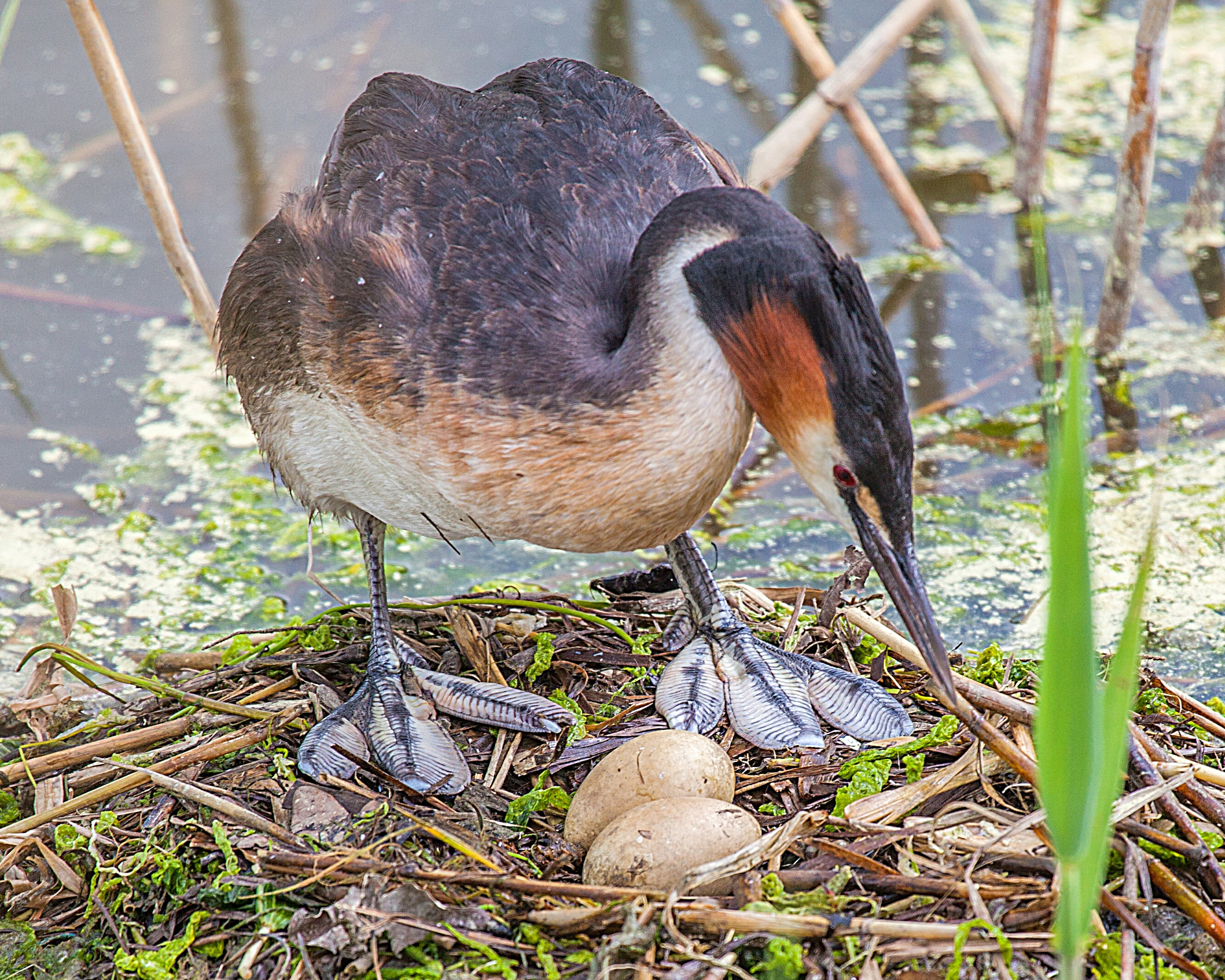
Podiceps cristatus with nest and eggs, Sweden

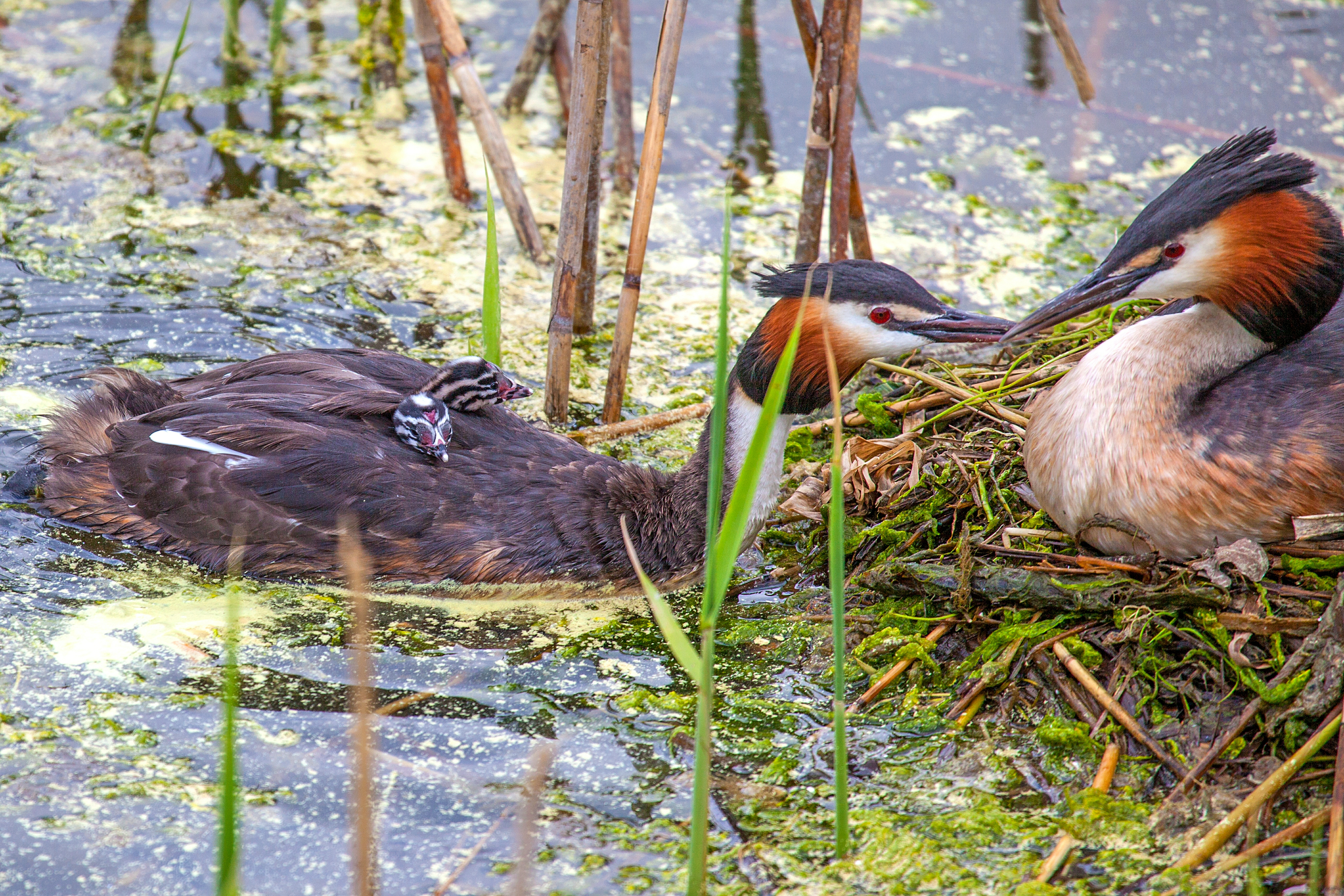
Podiceps cristatus family at nest, Sweden

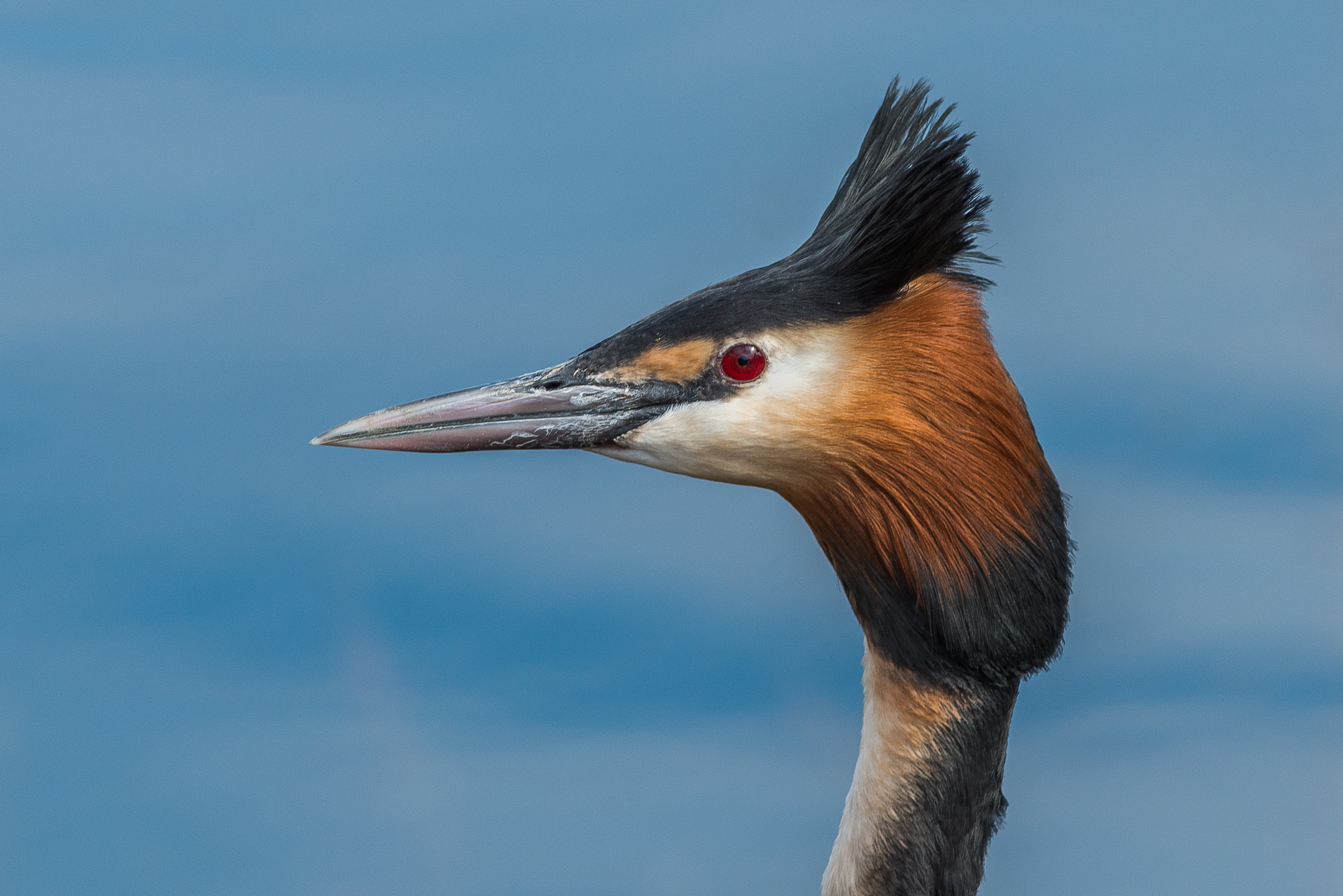
Podiceps cristatus, Sweden

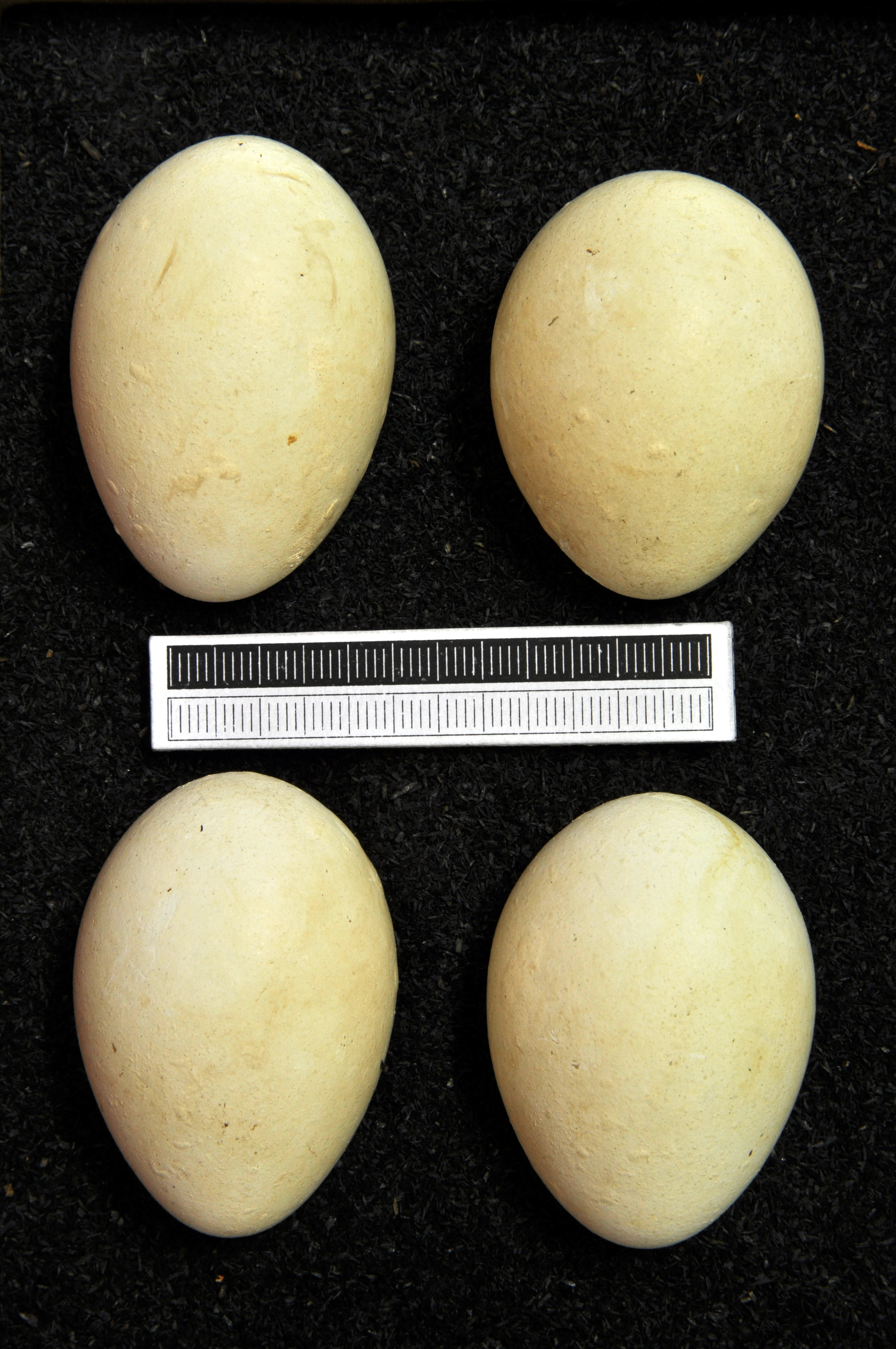
Eggs from the collection of the Museum Wiesbaden, Germany

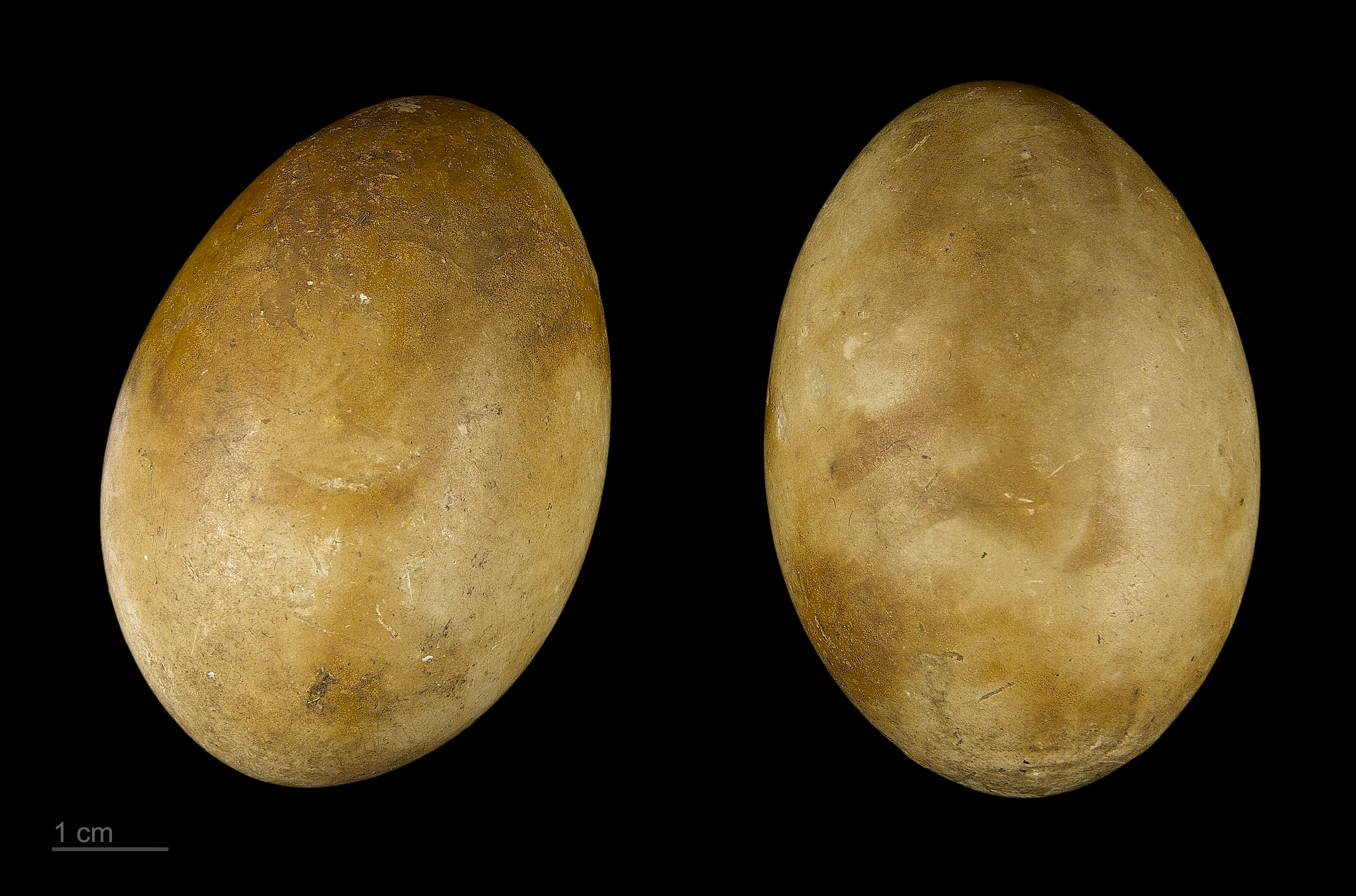
Eggs from the MHNT museum collection
