= Allocyttus guineensis =

Guinea oreo

Conservation status
- Least Concern (IUCN 3.1)

Scientific classification
- Kingdom: Animalia
- Phylum: Chordata
- Class: Actinopterygii
- Order: Zeiformes
- Family: Oreosomatidae
- Genus: Allocyttus
- Species: A. guineensis

Binomial name
- Allocyttus guineensis Trunov & Kukuev, 1982

Species of fish

Allocyttus guineensis, the Guinea oreo, is a species of oreo in the family Oreosomatidae, found in the eastern Atlantic Ocean.

== Description ==
This species reaches a length of 23.2 cm (9.1 in).
