= Oxeye =

Oxeye may refer to:

== Plants ==
A number of genera in the family Asteraceae:

Oxeyes (or ox-eyes)

- Heliopsis
- Heteranthemis
- Telekia

Creeping oxeyes

- Sphagneticola, e.g. Bay Biscayne creeping-oxeye (S. trilobata)
- Wedelia

Oxeye daisies

- Buphthalmum
- Leucanthemum vulgare

== Marine fish ==
- Oxeye or Indopacific Tarpon (Megalops cyprinoides)
- Species in the family Oreosomatidae
  - Oxeye oreo (Allocyttus folletti)
  - Ox-eyed oreo (Oreosoma atlanticum)

== Birds ==
- Sandpiper
  - Dunlin
- Great tit

== Other ==
- Oxeye window
