= Black Bullet (disambiguation) =

Black Bullet is a Japanese light novel series.

Black Bullet may also refer to:

- Black Bullet (film), a 1974 film
- Northrop XP-56 Black Bullet, a prototype aircraft

== See also ==
- Black Bullets, a confectionery brand
