= Uncle Joe's Mint Balls =

English mint brand

- Product type: Mint
- Current owner: William Santus & Co
- Produced by: William Santus & Co
- Country: United Kingdom
- Introduced: 1898; 128 years ago
- Markets: Worldwide
- Tagline: Keep You All Aglow
- Website: uncle-joes.com

Uncle Joe's Mint Balls are mints produced by William Santus & Co in Wigan, Greater Manchester, England since 1898. Despite their name, the mints are not truly spherical but oblate spheroids. The ingredients of Uncle Joe's Mint Balls are pure cane sugar, oil of peppermint and cream of tartar and are described on the tin as "suitable for vegans".

As of 2011, 160,000 mint balls are made per day, which is around 35 million per year.

The early mint balls were made by William Santus' wife, Ellen, before production moved to a factory near Wigan Wallgate railway station in 1919.

The packaging, usually a sealed can, carries a picture of the mascot, a smiling man in a top hat.

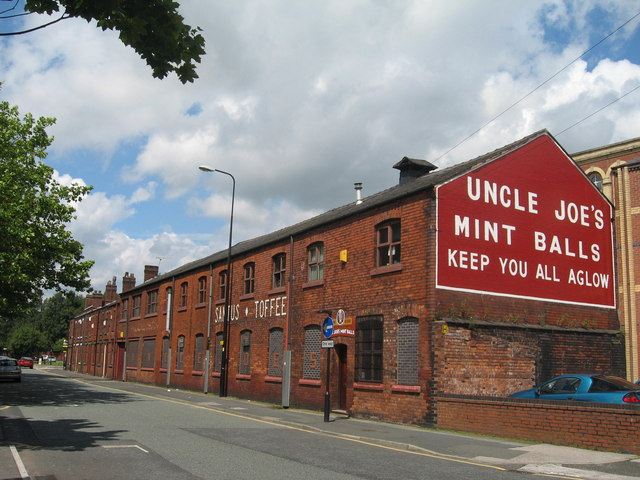
The factory in Wigan where Uncle Joe's Mint Balls are made

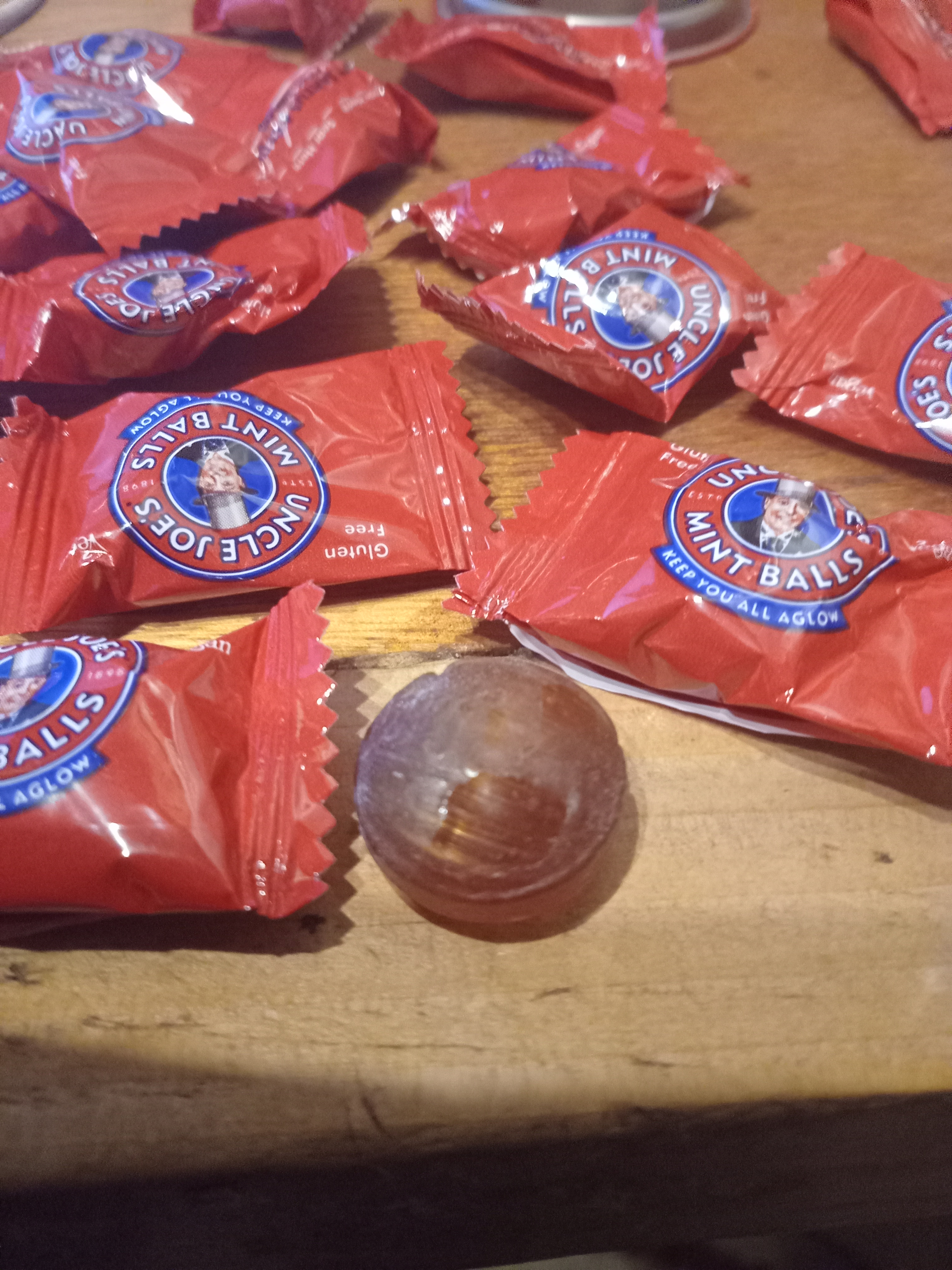
The individually wrapped sweets

== See also ==
- Black Bullets
- Humbugs
- List of confectionery brands
