= ODOT =

ODOT may refer to:

- Ohio Department of Transportation
- Oklahoma Department of Transportation
- Oregon Department of Transportation
- Circled dot (disambiguation)
