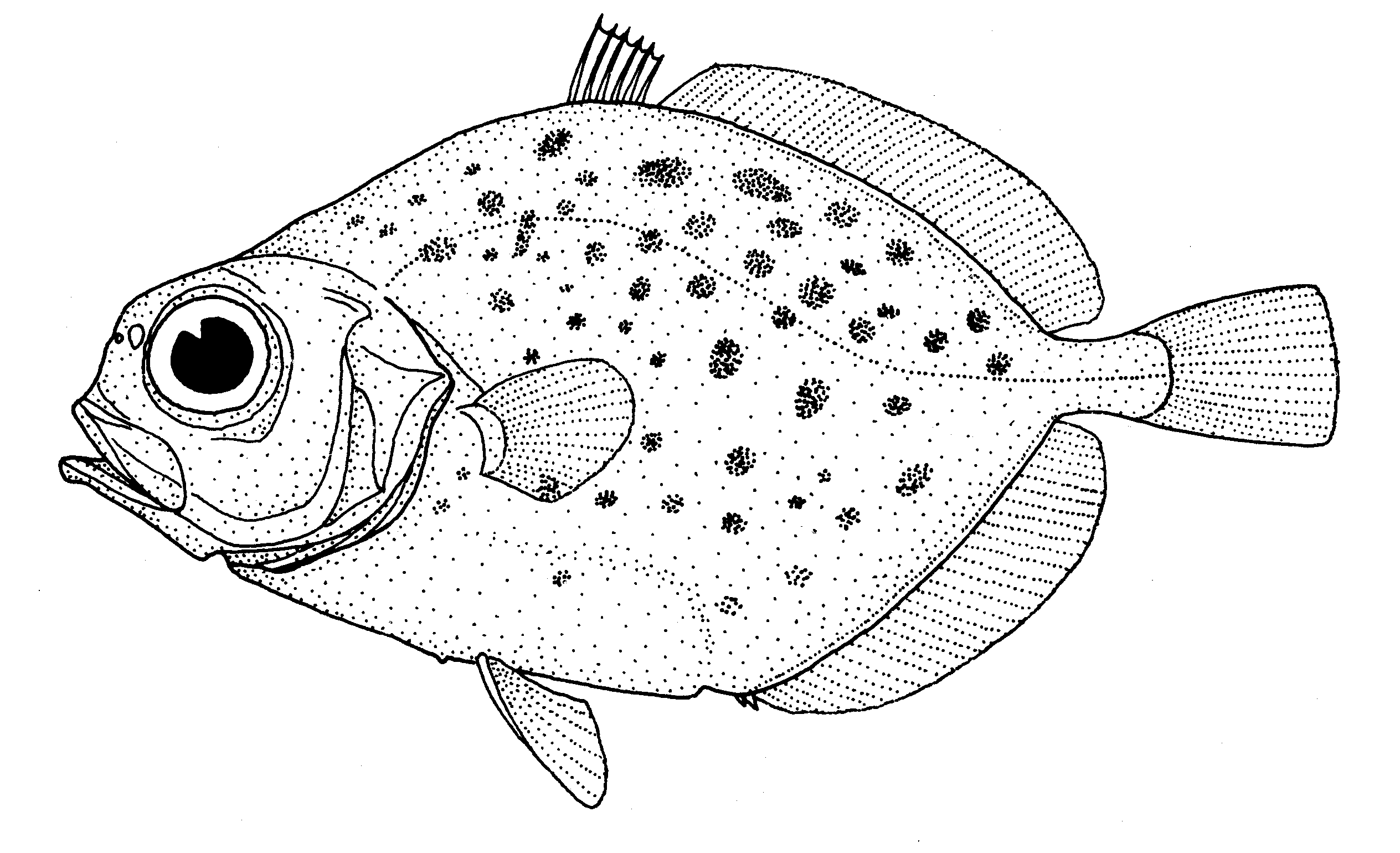
- Drawing by Dr Tony Ayling

Conservation status
- Data Deficient (IUCN 3.1)

Scientific classification
- Kingdom: Animalia
- Phylum: Chordata
- Class: Actinopterygii
- Order: Zeiformes
- Family: Oreosomatidae
- Subfamily: Pseudocyttinae; Tyler, O'Toole & Winterbottom, 2003
- Genus: Pseudocyttus; Gilchrist, 1906
- Species: P. maculatus

Binomial name
- Pseudocyttus maculatus Gilchrist, 1906

= Pseudocyttus =

Species of fish

Pseudocyttus maculatus, the smooth oreo or smooth dory, is an oreo, the only species in the genus Pseudocyttus. It is found in all southern oceans at depths of between 400 and 1,500 metres (1,310 and 4,920 ft). Its length is up to 60 centimetres (24 in).
