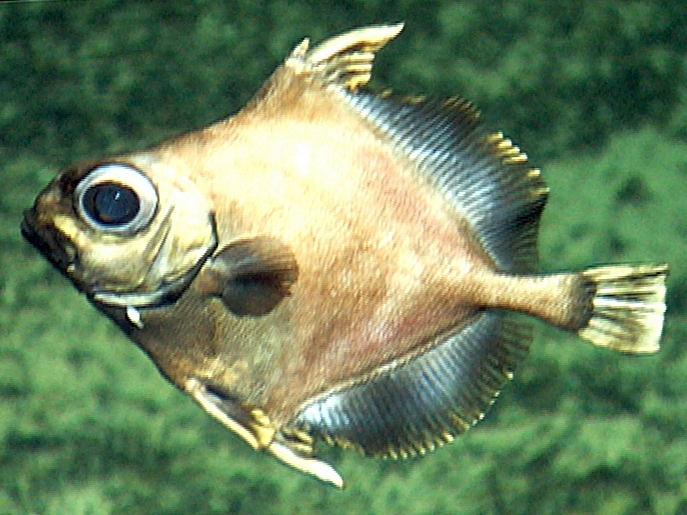

Conservation status
- Least Concern (IUCN 3.1)

Scientific classification
- Kingdom: Animalia
- Phylum: Chordata
- Class: Actinopterygii
- Order: Zeiformes
- Family: Oreosomatidae
- Genus: Neocyttus
- Species: N. helgae

Binomial name
- Neocyttus helgae (Holt & Byrne, 1908)

Synonyms
- Cyttosoma helgae Holt & Byrne, 1908; Crassispinus granulosus Maul, 1948

= False boarfish =

Species of fish

The false boarfish (Neocyttus helgae) is a species of fish in the family Oreosomatidae (oreos).

== Description ==
The false boarfish is dark grey in colour, with a maximum length of 30.5 cm (12.0 in). It has 6–7 dorsal spines, 34–35 dorsal soft rays, 3–4 anal spines and 31–32 anal soft rays. It is diamond-shaped, with a protruding small mouth and large spiny rays present at the anterior edges of the fins.

== Habitat ==
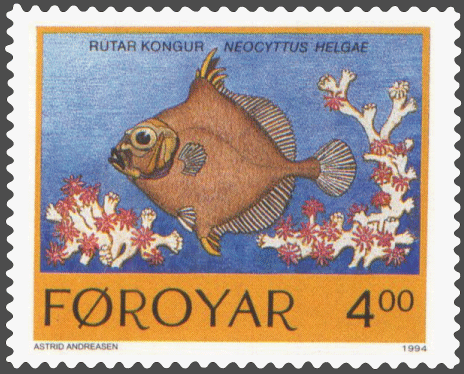
The false boarfish on a Faroese stamp; it is called by its Faroese name rútar kongur ("king of diamonds").

Neocyttus helgae is bathypelagic, living at depths of 915–1,829 m (3,002–6,001 ft) in the North Atlantic Ocean, being found off Madeira and Ireland and in the Cantabrian Sea.

== Behaviour ==
The false boarfish feeds off zooplankton and raises its dorsal spine as a territorial display. It feeds near to Paragorgia coral.
