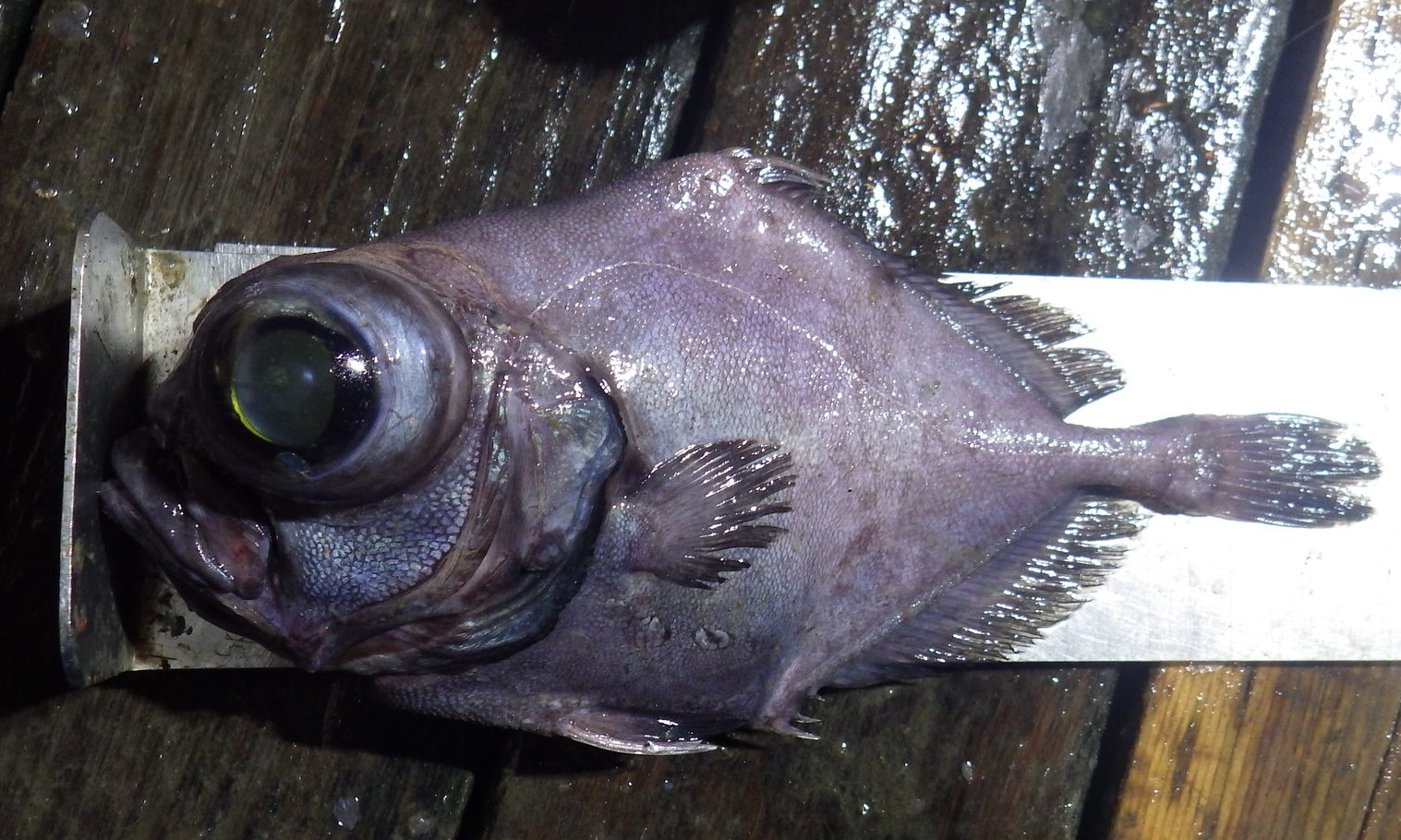

Scientific classification
- Kingdom: Animalia
- Phylum: Chordata
- Class: Actinopterygii
- Order: Zeiformes
- Family: Oreosomatidae
- Genus: Allocyttus
- Species: A. folletti

Binomial name
- Allocyttus folletti G. S. Myers, 1960

= Allocyttus folletti =

Oxeye oreo

Species of fish

Allocyttus folletti, the oxeye oreo, is a species of oreo in the family Oreosomatidae, found in the northern Pacific Ocean, from Japan to the Bering Sea and around to southern-central California.

== Description ==
This species reaches a length of 42.0 cm (16.5 in).

== Etymology ==
The fish is named in honor of Wilbur (“Bill”) I. Follett (1901–1992), the Curator of Fishes at the California Academy of Sciences, “as a token of personal esteem” and for his “deep interest and broad knowledge” of California fishes.
