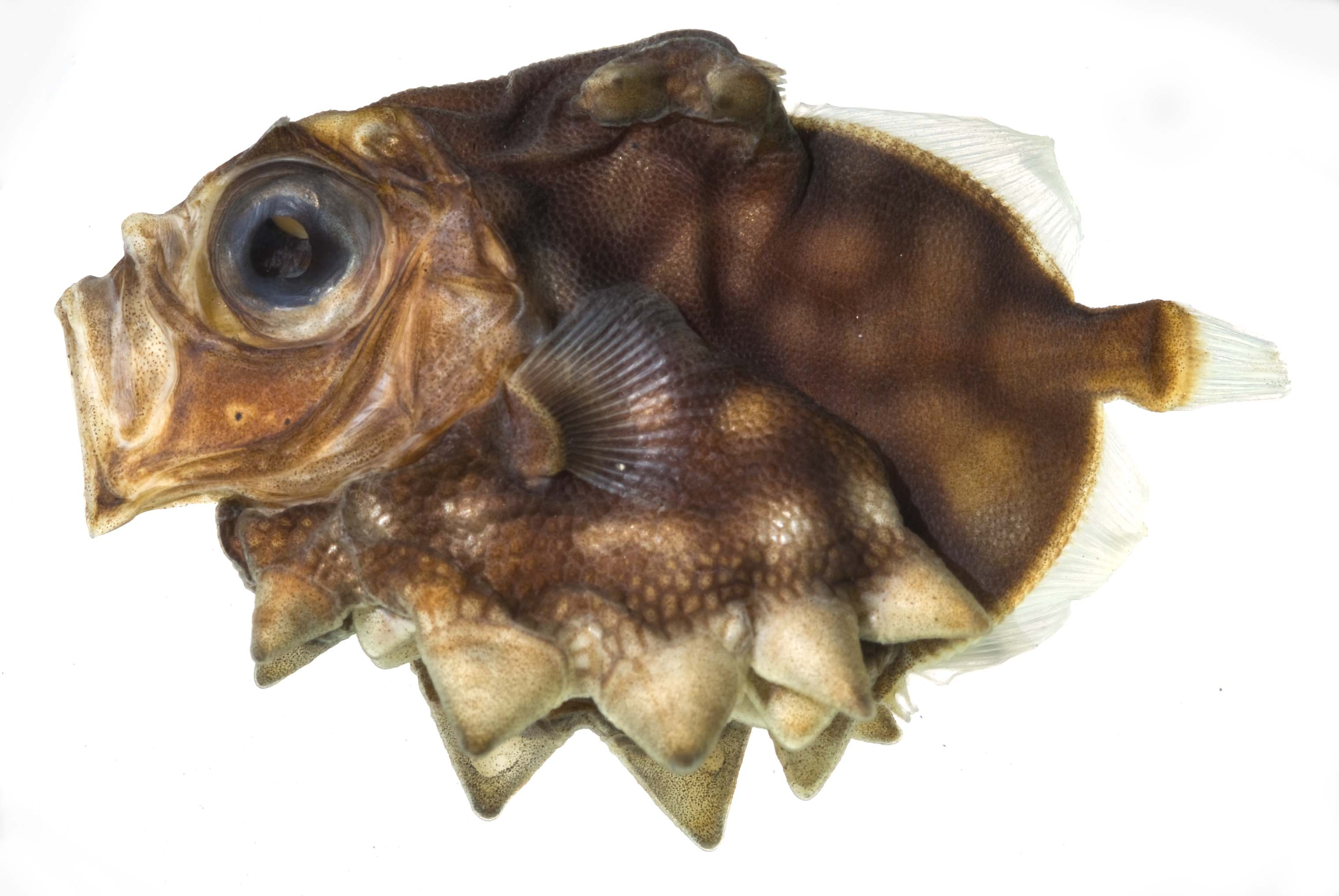

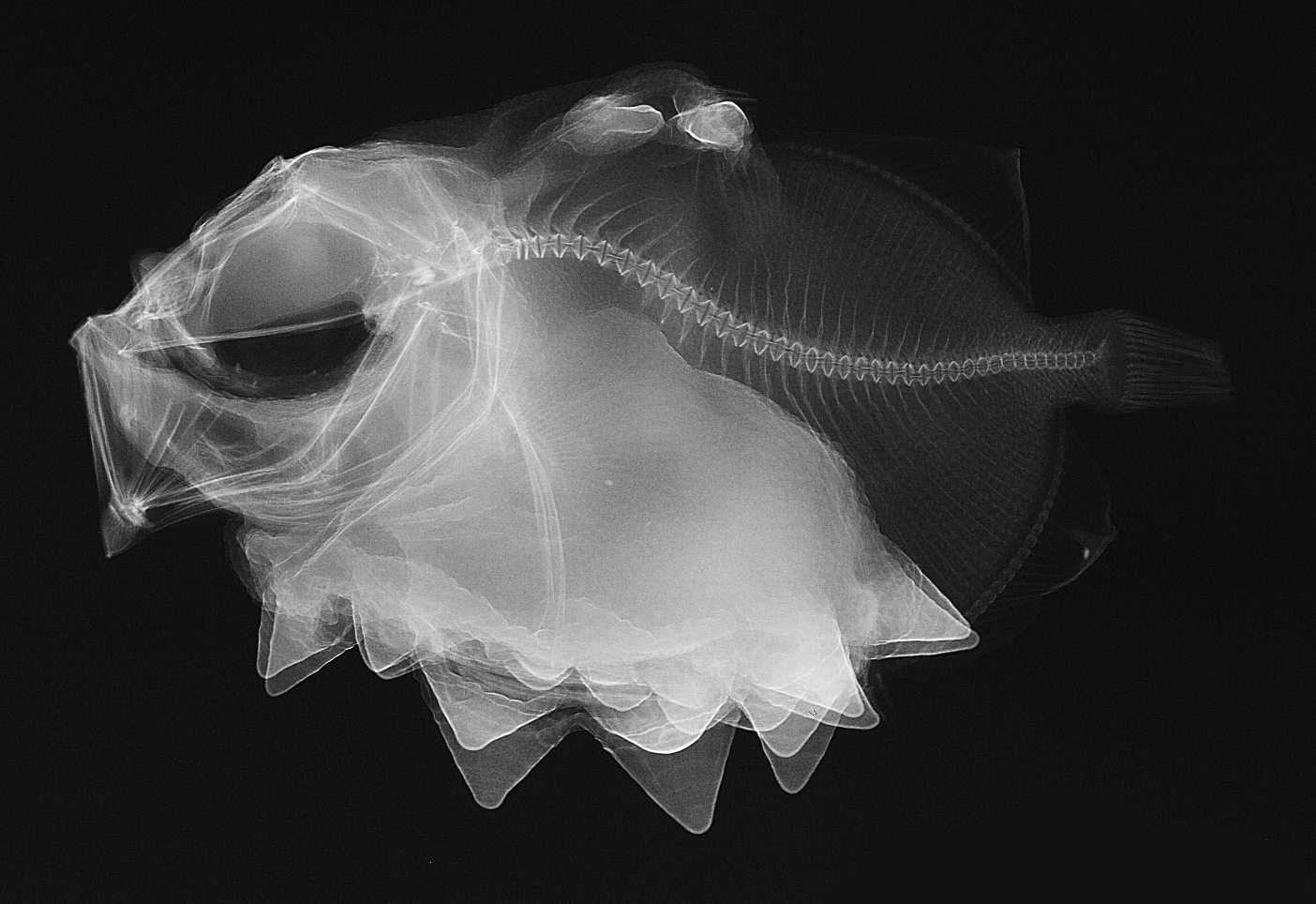
- Oreosoma atlanticum, conventional and X-ray images

Scientific classification
- Kingdom: Animalia
- Phylum: Chordata
- Class: Actinopterygii
- Division: Teleostei
- Order: Zeiformes
- Family: Oreosomatidae
- Subfamily: Oreosomatinae
- Genus: Oreosoma; G. Cuvier, 1829
- Species: O. atlanticum

Binomial name
- Oreosoma atlanticum G. Cuvier, 1829

= Oreosoma =

Species of fish

Oreosoma atlanticum, also known as the ox-eyed oreo, is a species of oreo found in oceanic deep waters. It is the only known member of its genus. Although adults are more similar in shape to other oreos, the juveniles have a distinctive plating/armor in their skin, which is spiked and probably makes them harder to eat for any hostile creature. Adults lack that plating, and, as other oreos, they have a protractile mouth and very large eyes, with small scales.

== Description ==
This species grows to a length of 21 cm (8.3 in). The adults are deep bodied and laterally compressed with a strongly humped back They have a small head with large eyes.

The juveniles are dark grey or black in colour with rounded white blotches. Their fins are translucent. They have a rounded stomach with two rows of cone-shaped protrusions. They have another four rows of similar protrusions along their backs. These projections make them highly distinctive.

== Distribution and habitat ==
This species is found at depths of 220 to 1,550 m (720 to 5,090 ft).

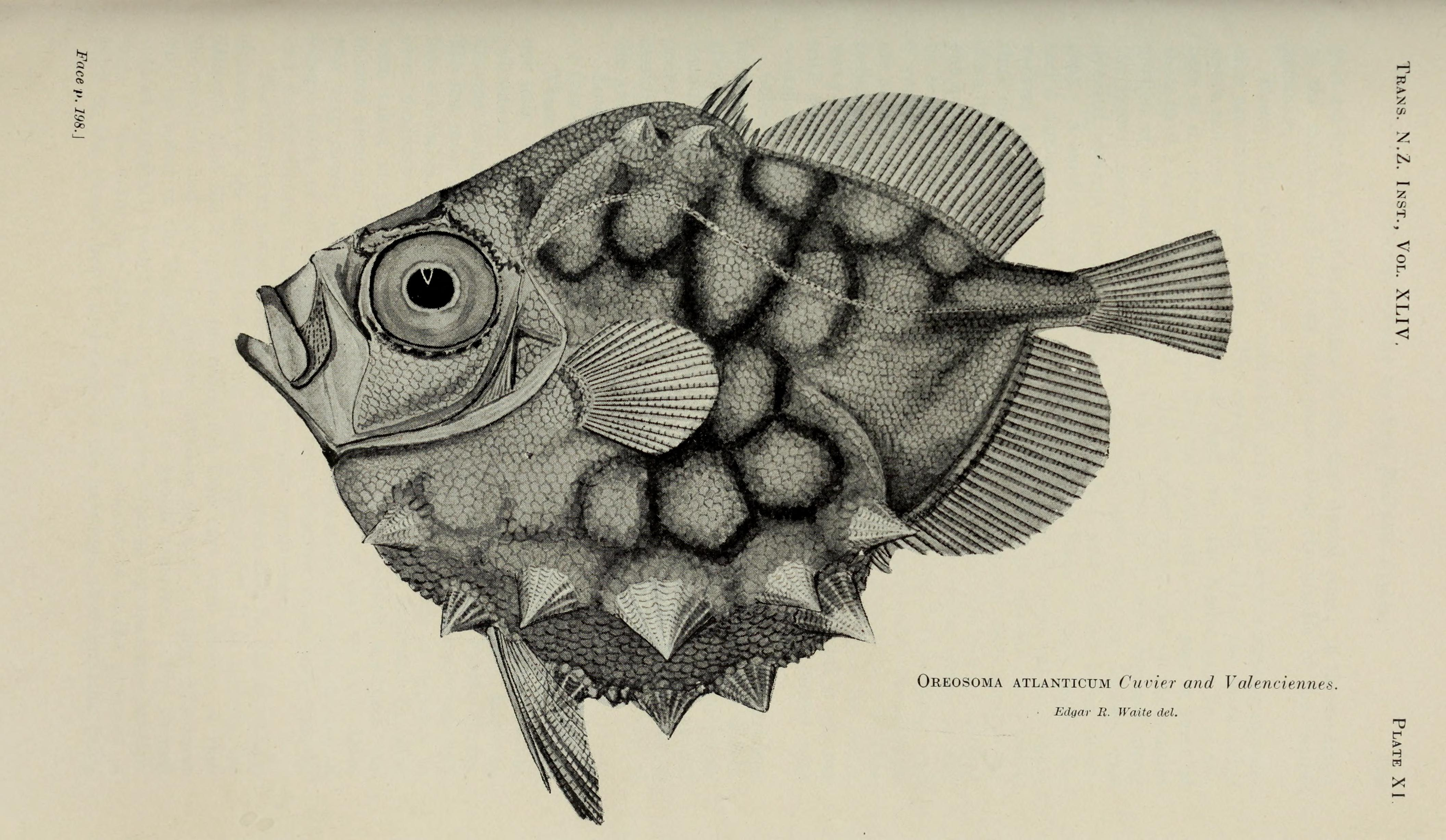
1911 drawing.
