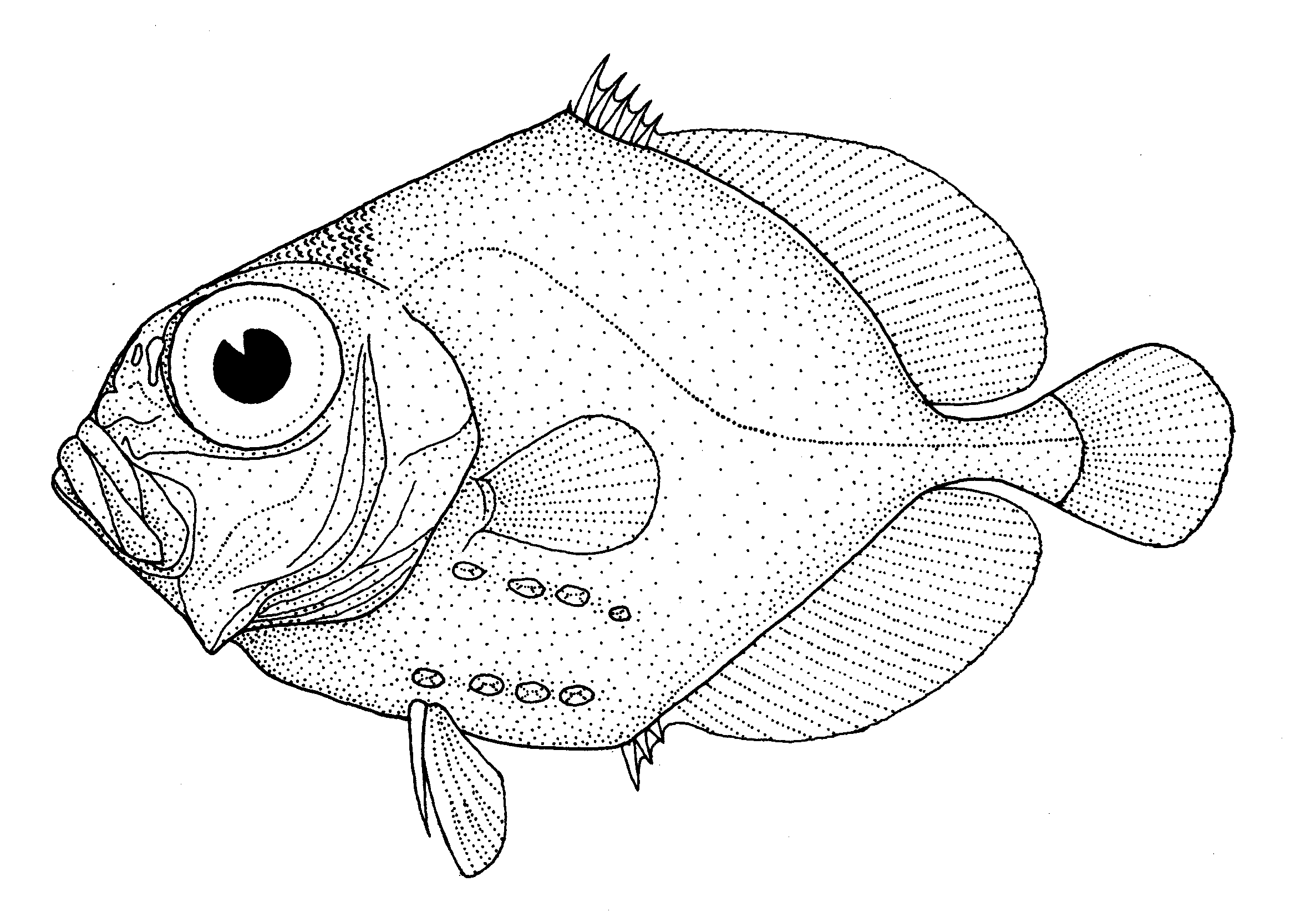
- Allocyttus verrucosus

Scientific classification
- Kingdom: Animalia
- Phylum: Chordata
- Class: Actinopterygii
- Order: Zeiformes
- Family: Oreosomatidae
- Subfamily: Oreosomatinae
- Genus: Allocyttus; McCulloch, 1914

= Allocyttus =

Genus of fishes

Allocyttus is a genus of oreos.

== Species ==
There are currently four recognized species in this genus:

- Allocyttus folletti G. S. Myers, 1960 (Oxeye oreo)
- Allocyttus guineensis Trunov & Kukuev, 1982 (Guinea oreo)
- Allocyttus niger G. D. James, Inada & I. Nakamura, 1988 (Black oreo)
- Allocyttus verrucosus (Gilchrist, 1906) (Warty dory)
