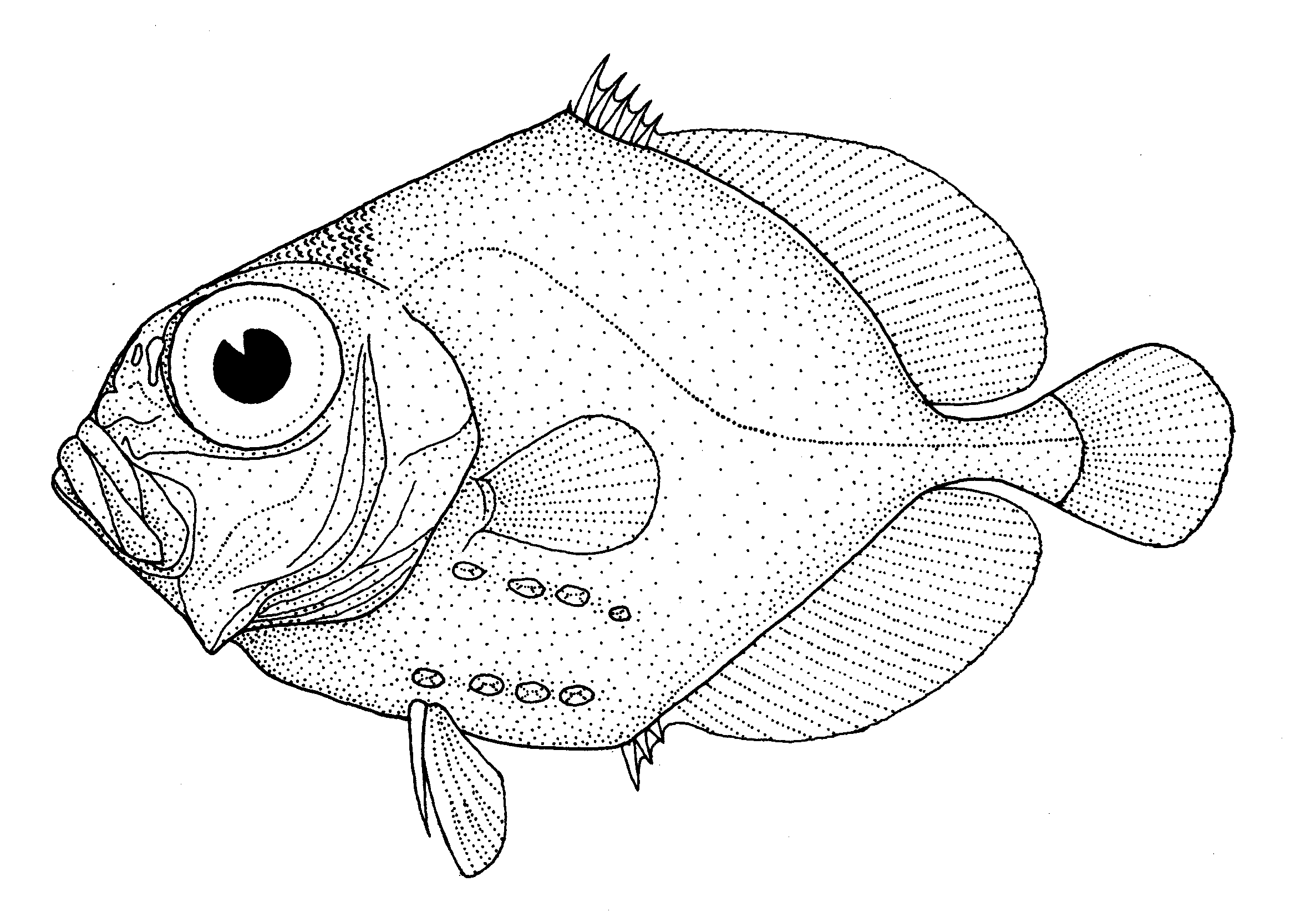
- Drawing by Dr Tony Ayling

Conservation status
- Least Concern (IUCN 3.1)

Scientific classification
- Kingdom: Animalia
- Phylum: Chordata
- Class: Actinopterygii
- Order: Zeiformes
- Family: Oreosomatidae
- Genus: Allocyttus
- Species: A. verrucosus

Binomial name
- Allocyttus verrucosus Gilchrist, 1906

= Warty oreo =

Species of fish

The warty oreo (Allocyttus verrucosus) is an oreo found in all southern oceans at depths of between 300 and 1,600 m. Its length is up to 42 cm.

The warty oreo resembles the spiky oreo. However, there are differences: the body, which has a shape much like a diamond, has a lower corner not as pointed, a dorsal which is not as tall as that of the spiky oreo, and there are spines along the warty oreo's anal fin. In addition, there are two rows of scales, which are relatively large and warty, bedecking the sides of the warty oreo between the fish's pelvic fin and its anal fin. The warty oreo has a dark gray colour and is black-finned. They have only 1 spine in their pelvic fins. They have large eyes, possibly to see easier in the darkness of their habitat.

Warty oreos live in the waters of continental slopes, and they form in large schools over rough terrain. Young warty oreos are pelagic and reside in shallow waters of the oceans - less than a kilometer in depth. They eat other fish, as well as cephalopods and shrimp. The eggs and larvae of warty oreos live on or near the surface of the sea.

They are very long living creatures, the oldest living to be 210 years old. This sets it as one of the longest living macrovertebrates in the world, along with the Greenland shark, the Orange roughy and the Bowhead whale, that can reach 400, 250 and 200 respectively.
