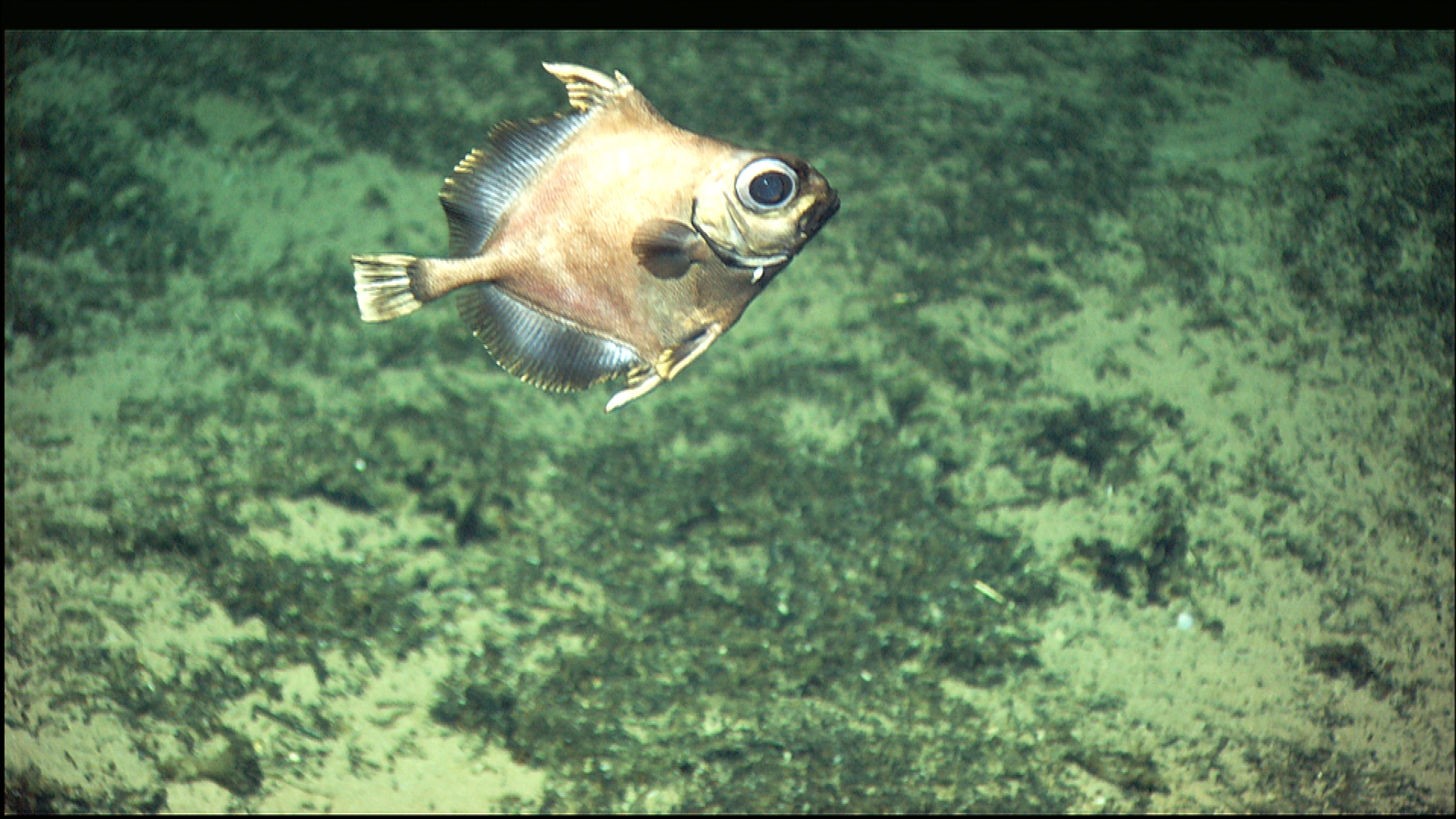
- False Boarfish (N. helgae)

Scientific classification
- Kingdom: Animalia
- Phylum: Chordata
- Class: Actinopterygii
- Order: Zeiformes
- Family: Oreosomatidae
- Subfamily: Oreosomatinae
- Genus: Neocyttus; Gilchrist, 1906

= Neocyttus =

Genus of fishes

Neocyttus is a genus of oreos.

== Species ==
There are currently four recognized species in this genus:

- Neocyttus acanthorhynchus Regan, 1908
- Neocyttus helgae (Holt & Byrne, 1908) (False boarfish)
- Neocyttus psilorhynchus Yearsley & Last, 1998 (Rough oreodory)
- Neocyttus rhomboidalis Gilchrist, 1906 (Spiky oreo)
