= Double Bullseye =

Double Bullseye may mean:

- Double Bullseye, or Inner Bullseye (target)
  - Double Bull in Darts
- Double Bullseye, a pricing game in The Price Is Right

== See also ==
- Bullseye (disambiguation)
- Fresnel lens
