= Fisheye =

Fisheye may refer to:

- The organ providing vision in fish
- Fisheye lens, an ultra wide-angle lens
- Fish Eye (Sailor Moon), a fictional character
- Fisheye (album), rock band Callalily
- FishEye (software), a revision-control browser
- Fish Eye Marine Park in Piti Bomb Holes Marine Preserve
- A blemish of spray painting
- ◉, a circled dot symbol
