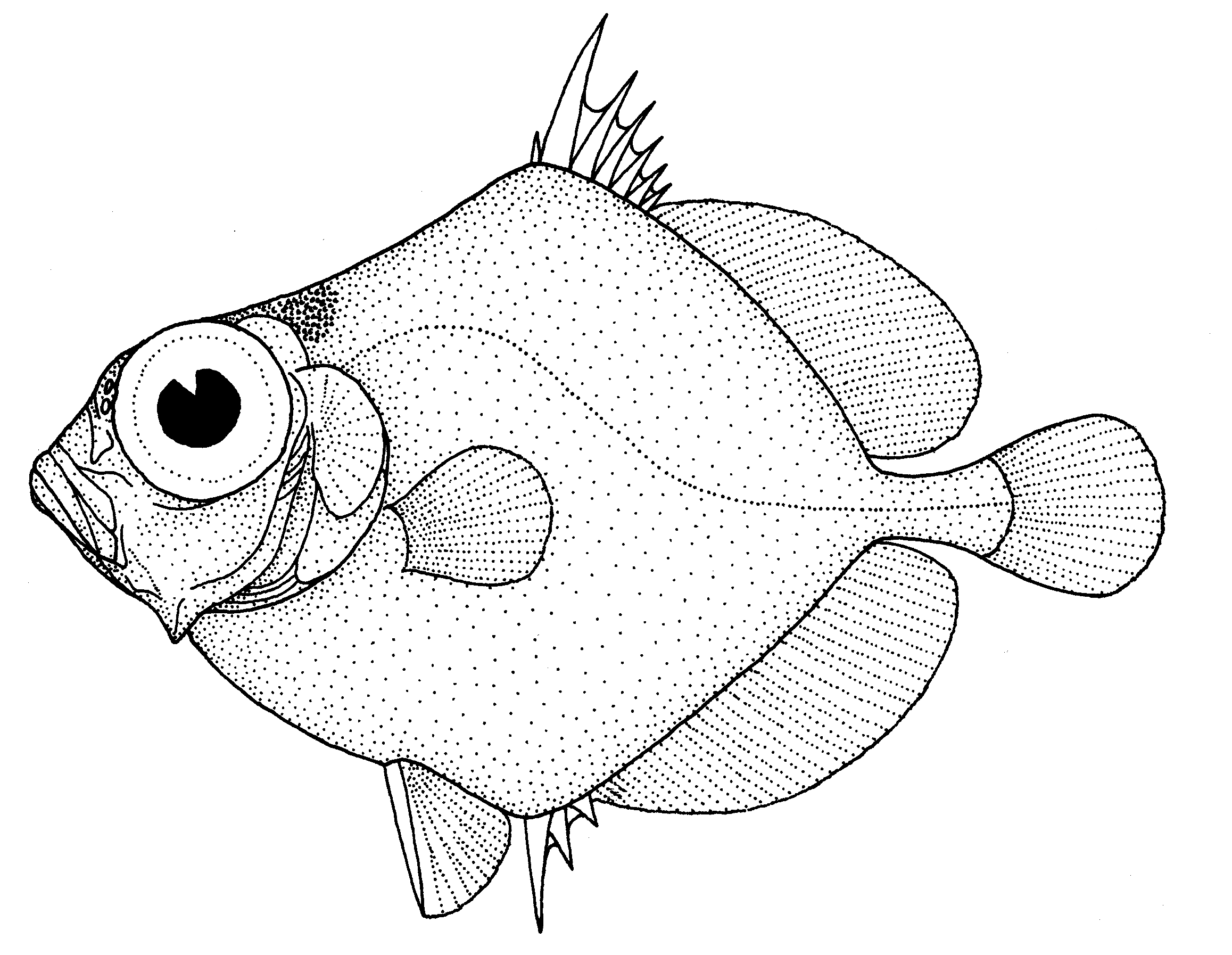
- Drawing by Dr Tony Ayling

Scientific classification
- Kingdom: Animalia
- Phylum: Chordata
- Class: Actinopterygii
- Order: Zeiformes
- Family: Oreosomatidae
- Genus: Neocyttus
- Species: N. rhomboidalis

Binomial name
- Neocyttus rhomboidalis Gilchrist, 1906

= Spiky oreo =

Species of fish

The spiky oreo (Neocyttus rhomboidalis) is an oreo of the genus Neocyttus, found in all southern oceans at depths of between 200 and 1,300 m. Its length is up to 40 cm.
