= Bullseye cardinalfish =

Bullseye cardinalfish is a common name for several fishes and may refer to:

- Apogonichthyoides atripes, in the genus Apogonichthyoides
- Apogonichthyoides nigripinnis, in the genus Apogonichthyoides
- Ostorhinchus fleurieu
