= Black Bullets =

British confection

Black Bullets, properly called Jesmona Black Bullets, are a confectionery produced for Mr Swainstons Ltd, a traditional sweet shop from the English town of South Shields. Mr Swainstons gained TV success after appearing on BBC Dragons' Den, where they secured investment from Jenna Meek.

Black Bullets are popular throughout the north of England, most notably in Newcastle, where it is said they gained a great deal of popularity with the local miners. The name Jesmona refers to the Jesmond area of Newcastle and is a registered trademark which Mr Swainstons hold a 3 year exclusive licensing agreement for distribution and retail.

Black Bullets are spherical, dark brown, peppermint-flavored boiled sweets. They contain only three ingredients: sugar, glucose, and peppermint oil. They are available either in tins of various sizes or individually wrapped in bags.

The tins are notable for their traditional decorative style which uses only black and white, with text reading "Jesmona Old Fashioned Black Bullets."

== See also ==
- Humbugs
- Uncle Joe's Mint Balls
- Hard candy
