= Circled dot =

Graphic and typographic symbol

ʘ ⊙ ◉ ☉ ⨀ ⵙ Ꙩ 𐍈 𐓃 𑀣 𝇇o

Circled dot
- In Unicode: U+0298 ʘ LATIN LETTER BILABIAL CLICK; U+2299 ⊙ CIRCLED DOT OPERATOR; U+25C9 ◉ FISHEYE; U+2609 ☉ SUN; U+2A00 ⨀ N-ARY CIRCLED DOT OPERATOR; U+2D59 ⵙ TIFINAGH LETTER YAS; U+A668 Ꙩ CYRILLIC CAPITAL LETTER MONOCULAR O; U+10348 𐍈 GOTHIC LETTER HWAIR; U+104C3 𐓃 OSAGE CAPITAL LETTER OIN; U+11023 𑀣 BRAHMI LETTER THA; U+1D1C7 𝇇 MUSICAL SYMBOL TEMPUS PERFECTUM CUM PROLATIONE PERFECTA

Different from
- Different from: U+229A ⊚ CIRCLED RING OPERATOR; U+25CE ◎ BULLSEYE; U+131F3 𓇳 EGYPTIAN HIEROGLYPH N005

The circled dot, circumpunct, or circle with a point at its centre may refer to one or more glyphs, graphemes or concepts.

== Solar system ==
- One of many solar symbols used to represent the Sun
- U+2609 ☉ SUN (Planet symbol in astronomy)
  - Gold (Alchemical symbols: planetary metals)
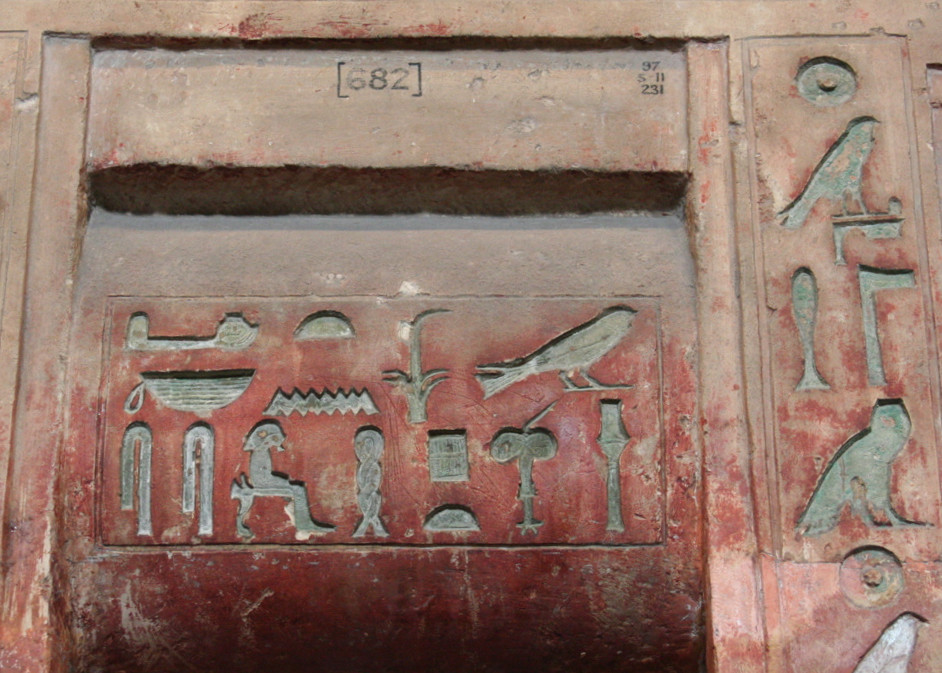
- A graphic variant of the Egyptian hieroglyph 𓇳 with a boss/nipple in the center (top and bottom right).
  Gardiner N5 (U+131F3 𓇳 EGYPTIAN HIEROGLYPH N005): The sun, part of the representation of the name of Ra in Egyptian hieroglyphs. This hieroglyph is conventionally shown with a small circle (rather than a dot) inside the large circle. Some variants carved in rock display a broad carved ring forming a concave circle with a raised central dot.
- The sun / a day (Chinese oracle bone script or bronze script, the modern character being 日)

== Philosophy and psychology ==
- Self in Jungian psychology: "The central dot represents the Ego whereas the Self can be said to consist of the whole with the centred dot."
- Monism: "The circled dot was used by the Pythagoreans and later Greeks to represent the first metaphysical being, the Monad or The Absolute"

== Language and linguistics ==
- Bilabial clicks (U+0298 ʘ LATIN LETTER BILABIAL CLICK), a symbol in the International Phonetic Alphabet.
- Hwair (U+10348 𐍈 GOTHIC LETTER HWAIR), a letter in the Gothic alphabet
- Cyrillic letter monocular O (U+A668 Ꙩ CYRILLIC CAPITAL LETTER MONOCULAR O & U+A669 ꙩ CYRILLIC SMALL LETTER MONOCULAR O), rarely used in place of the letter O as a visual pun in words like ꙩко "eye".
- Yas (U+2D59 ⵙ TIFINAGH LETTER YAS), a letter in the Tifinagh Alphabet (Berber languages)
- Brāhmī letter tha (U+11023 𑀣 BRAHMI LETTER THA)
  - Tocharian letter tha (derived from the above)
- Osage letter oin (U+104C3 𐓃 OSAGE CAPITAL LETTER OIN & U+104EB 𐓫 OSAGE SMALL LETTER OIN)
- Eye (Blissymbols)
- A brief contact (brush) of the signing hand in SignWriting

== Mathematics ==
- The mathematical operator U+2299 ⊙ CIRCLED DOT OPERATOR represents
  - the XNOR gate or
  - the Hadamard product, the element wise multiplication of matrices of same size denoted by $A \odot B$
- The mathematical operator U+2A00 ⨀ N-ARY CIRCLED DOT OPERATOR (see Unicode Supplemental Mathematical Operators)
- In geometry, it is often the symbol for a circle

== Computing ==
- U+25C9 ◉ FISHEYE (Unicode Geometric Shapes)
  - An indication of selected choice of radio button
  - the application launcher key on Chromebooks (also known as the "everything key")
  - In Japan, the symbol is called tainome and is a kind of typographical "bullet"
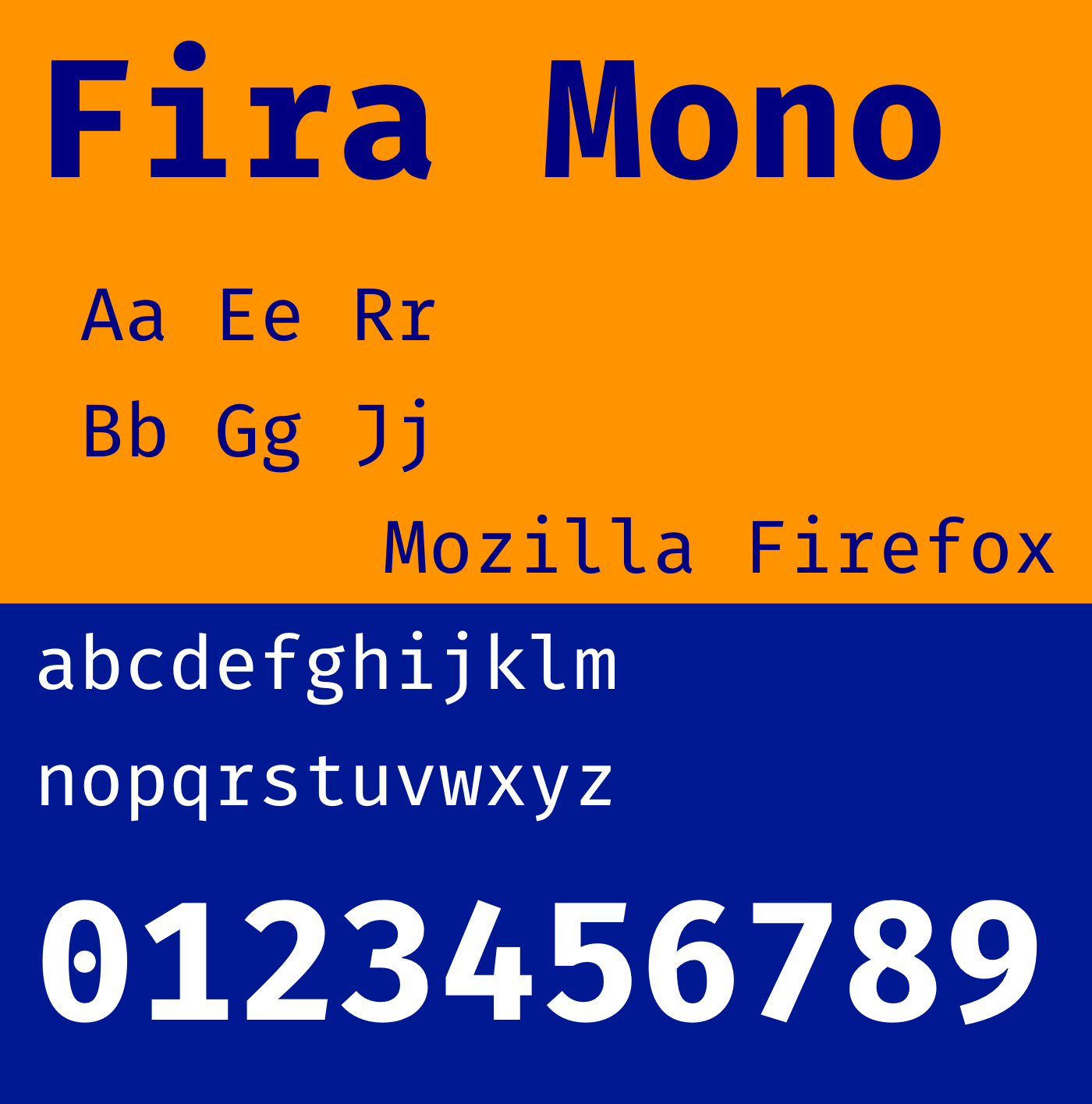
- The variant of 0 seen in the font Fira Mono (bottom left).
  A variant of U+0030 0 DIGIT ZERO, used to distinguish it from the graphically similar U+004F O LATIN CAPITAL LETTER O, in some monospaced fonts like Cascadia Code, DejaVu Sans Mono, Fira Mono, JetBrains Mono, and Source Code Pro.

== Other uses ==
- A nazar is a circled-dot-shaped amulet
- Center of pressure
- The musical symbol for tempus perfectum cum prolatione perfecta (U+1D1C7 𝇇 MUSICAL SYMBOL TEMPUS PERFECTUM CUM PROLATIONE PERFECTA), a Mensuration sign for 9/8 meter
- Used, or cancelled, stamp (philately)
  - In German stamp catalogues, it is symbol for a "Gestempelte Briefmarke" (canceled stamp), while a star means "postfrisch" (mint Stamp)
- The trademark of the Target Corporation
- As a Masonic symbol
- City centre (European road-signs)
- End of trail / End of the game. Gone home. (scouting)
- The symbol for a waterhole (or a related concept) in Indigenous Australian Art
- In physics, it can be used to denote a vector facing out of the page
- Zugzwang in chess notation

== See also ==
- Bullseye (disambiguation)
- The Lost Symbol – a novel by Dan Brown that uses this symbol; seen stylistically for ⟨o⟩ in the logo for the spinoff TV series
