= Humbug (sweet) =

Peppermint-flavoured boiled sweet

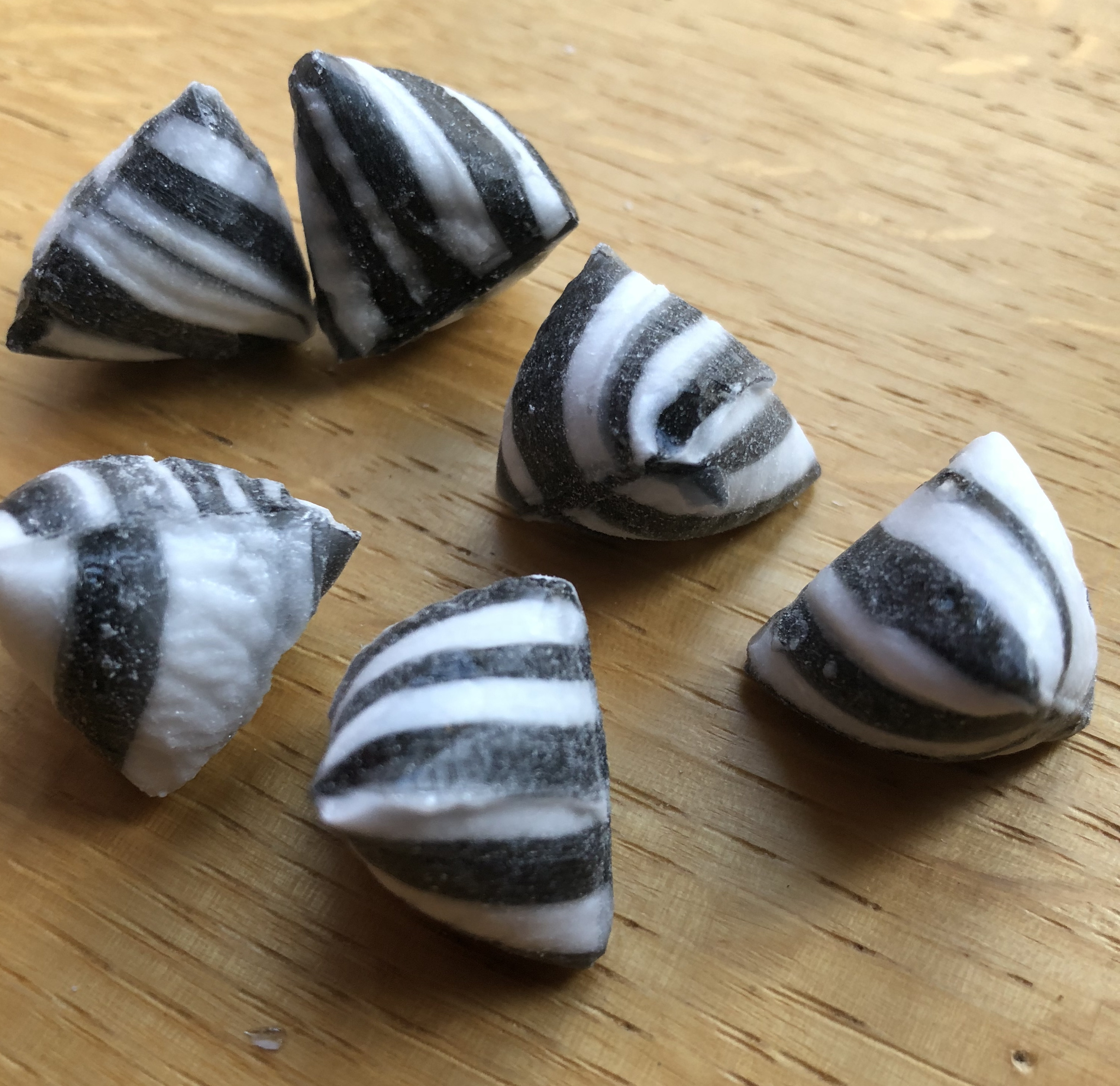
- Type: Confectionery
- Place of origin: United Kingdom
- Main ingredients: Sugar
- Ingredients generally used: Glycerine; colour; flavouring (usually peppermint)

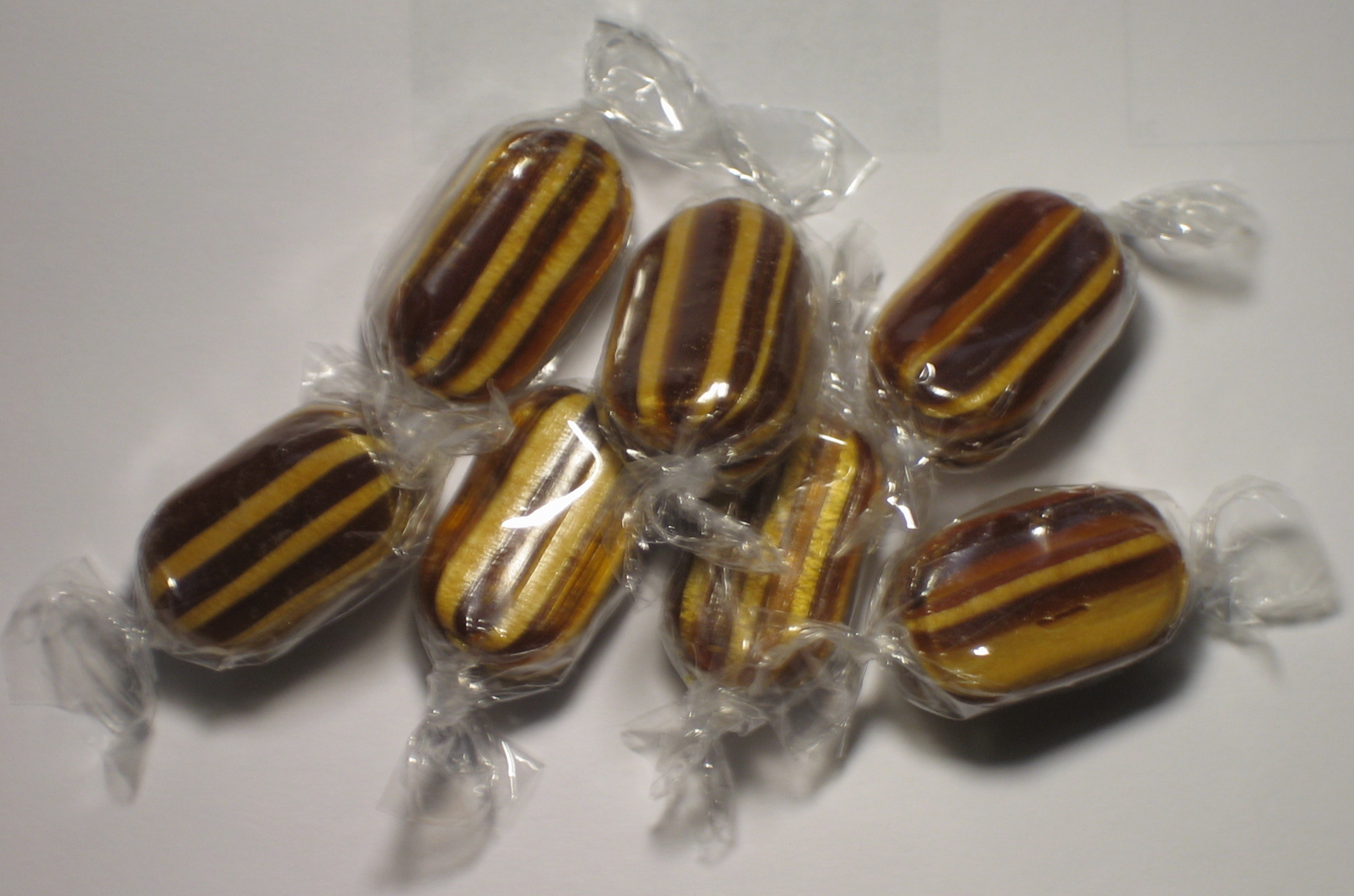
Mint humbugs

Humbugs are a traditional boiled sweet (hard candy) available in the United Kingdom, Ireland, South Africa, Canada, Australia, Zimbabwe and New Zealand. They are usually flavoured with peppermint and striped in two different colours (often black and white). In Australia, the black-and-white-striped humbugs may be aniseed flavoured. Humbugs may be cylinders with rounded ends wrapped in a twist of cellophane, or more traditionally tetrahedral, loose in a bag. Records of humbugs exist from as early as the 1820s, and they are referred to in the 1863 book Sylvia's Lovers as being a food from Northern England. The etymology is unknown.

== Manufacture ==
A mixture of sugar, glycerine, colour and flavouring is heated to 145 °C (293 °F). This mixture is then poured out, stretched and folded many times. The stripes originate from a smaller piece of coloured mixture which is folded into the main mixture. The mixture is finally rolled into a long, thin cylinder and sliced into segments.

== Bulls-eyes ==
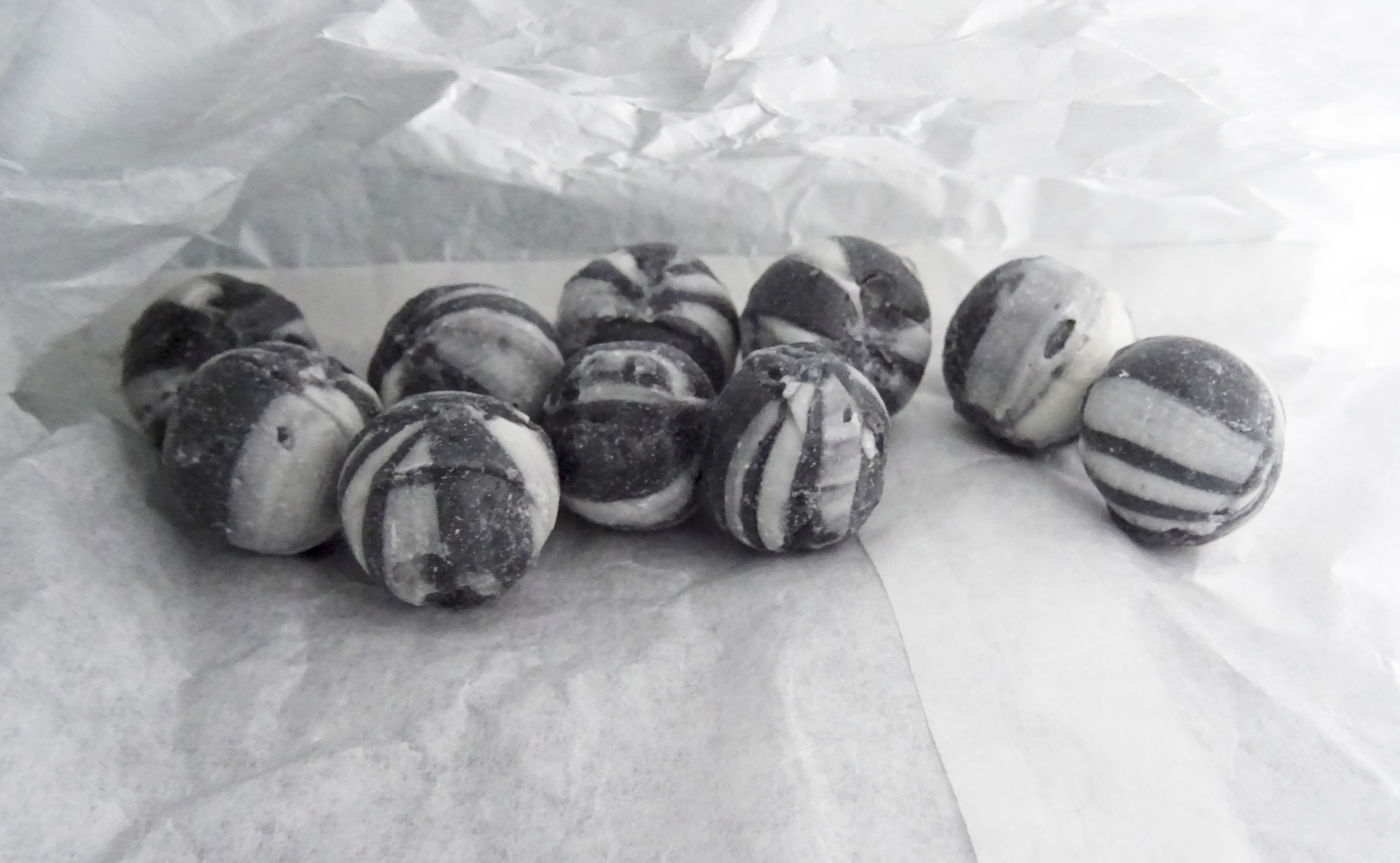
Bulls-eyes in a bag

A similar sweet is "bulls-eye" which has red-and-white or black-and-white stripes. These are peppermint-flavoured and are also known as Black Bullets in the UK, as they are hard and similar in size to smoothbore musket balls.

== See also ==
- 1858 Bradford sweets poisoning
- Bêtise de Cambrai – French boiled caramel sweet
- Gobstopper
