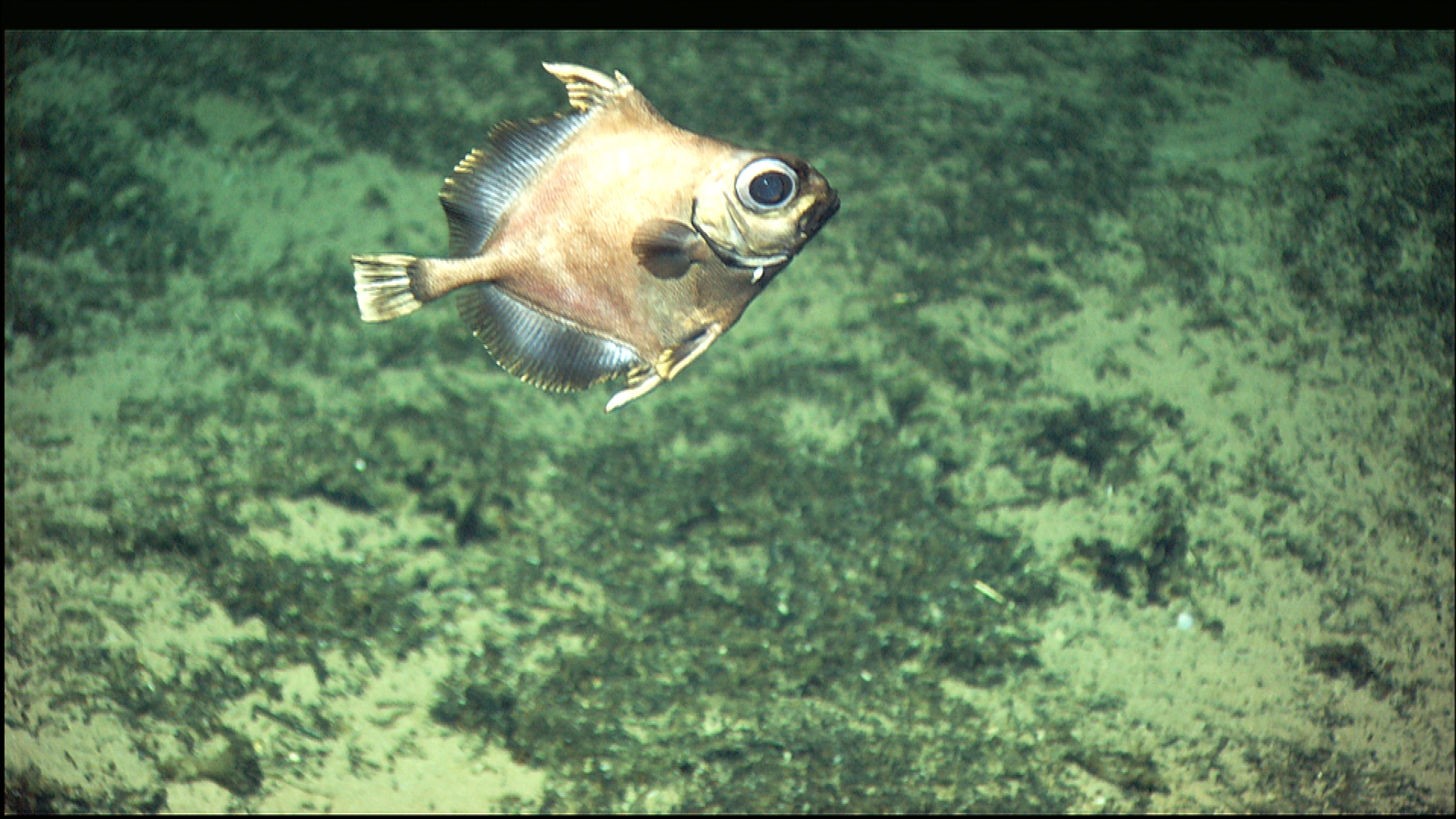
- Neocyttus helgae

Scientific classification
- Kingdom: Animalia
- Phylum: Chordata
- Class: Actinopterygii
- Order: Zeiformes
- Family: Oreosomatidae; Bleeker, 1859

Subfamilies and genera
- Subfamily Oreosomatinae; Allocyttus; Neocyttus; Oreosoma; Subfamily Pseudocyttinae; Pseudocyttus

= Oreosomatidae =

Family of fishes

Oreosomatidae, the oreos, are a family of marine fish. Most species are found in the Southern Hemisphere, inhabiting continental slopes down to about 1,000 m (3,300 ft) deep. Most of them are 43 cm at most, with the largest species reaching a length of 60 cm. Though they are small, they often have incredibly elongated lifespans, probable result of living in the deep sea (a trait shared with other unrelated fishes like the orange roughy). The warty oreo is able to live for up to 210 years, which puts it at one of the longest living vertebrates on Earth. They borrow their name from the Greek oreos (mountain) and somas (backs) for the shape of their backs. They are very flattened vertically-laterally, with 5 to 8 rays on their dorsal fin, and 2 to 4 on the anal fin, and only 1 spine in the pelvic fins. The upper part of the mouth is protractile, allowing them to snatch up little fishes, copepods, amphypods, shrimp, krill, and small cephalopods, their main diet.
