= On Early English Pronunciation =

1889 book by Alexander John Ellis

On Early English Pronunciation, with Especial Reference to Shakspere [sic] and Chaucer, containing an Investigation of the Correspondence of Writing with Speech in England from the Anglosaxon [sic] Period to the Present Day... is a series of linguistic texts in five parts by phonetician Alexander John Ellis, which treats on the historical and contemporary sound system of the English and Scots languages. Since its publication from 1869 to 1889, it has been cited continuously by dialectologists of English and Scots, owing to its survey data on the dialects in the 19th century. Ellis's palaeotype alphabet introduced in the series is a precursor to the modern International Phonetic Alphabet. The author is regularly cited by linguists as "A. J. Ellis" to distinguish him from Stanley Ellis, a prominent dialectologist of the 20th century.

== Division ==
- Part I (1869): pronunciation of English in the 16th, 17th, and 18th centuries; and pronunciation in the 14th century, deduced from Chaucer and Gower
- Part II (1869): pronunciation of English in the 13th and previous centuries; and correspondence between orthography and pronunciation from the Anglo-Saxon times to the present (19th century)
- Part III (1871): illustrations of pronunciation during the 14th century and 16th century, including "On the Pronunciation of Shakspere"
- Part IV (1874): illustrations of pronunciation during the 17th, 18th, and 19th centuries
- Part V (1889): existing (regional) English dialects compared with West Saxon speech

== Survey ==
In addition to inferring how English was pronounced in the past, A. J. Ellis attempted to record the local dialects in all areas where English or Scots was habitually spoken. This second endeavour began around 1870. The data in England were collected through three tools of investigation:

1. In 1875, he produced a "comparative specimen", consisting of 15 sentences to be read by informants in order to obtain "dialect renderings of familiar words in various connections and some characteristic constructions"
2. A classified word list of 971 items, of which numbers 1-712 were "Wessex and Norse" words, numbers 713-808 were "English" and numbers 809-971 were "Romance". This list also included a small number of grammatical constructions and some instructions on how to characterise the intonation of speech. The time that the word list was constructed is not clear, but it seems to have been shortly after the comparative specimen.
3. In 1879, he created the Dialect Test. This was a passage of 76 words, containing an example of almost all West Saxon phonemes.

In the case of Scotland, most of the data came from a previous survey by JAH Murray, Dialect of the Southern Counties of Scotland, but Orkney and Shetland were surveyed in the same way as England. He rejected printed sources, in favour of direct observation. A. J. Ellis initially expected that his survey would require only 30 pages in his On Early English Pronunciation series, but it eventually took 835 pages.

A. J. Ellis was aware that many speakers were bidialectal and would not speak to him, as an educated man, in the same way that they spoke to their families and friends. He was only interested in the latter speech, which he saw as the real dialect. Anderson noted that A. J. Ellis obtained some material directly from railway porters and domestic servants, and suggested that his decision not to contact other dialect speakers directly was "a characteristic of the age and not just of the man".

Much of A. J. Ellis's data were collected by Thomas Hallam. The concentration of sites across the country was very uneven, with a bias towards those sites that Hallam could reach by train from Manchester. His main job was in the canals department of the Manchester, Sheffield and Lincolnshire Railway offices. The two other main fieldworkers were J.G. Goodchild and C.C. Robinson. There were a further 811 voluntary helpers, mostly educated people who did not speak in the dialects that A. J. Ellis was researching; the contributions of these latter helpers has been criticised as a source of error.

In one case, A.J. Ellis noted that the vicarage of Annfield Plain in County Durham could not be reached for the survey because of snow on a hill between the railway station and the vicarage. Anderson cited this as evidence of the difficulties in administering a survey in the days before modern cars and roads.

== Palaeotype ==
A. J. Ellis made an early attempt to write phonetically, devising his palaeotype alphabet. This made use of several symbols not in everyday use in English to illustrate the variety of sounds. The palaeotype was also used by JAH Murray in his work in Scotland. It was adapted by Henry Sweet into the Romic alphabet, which was itself adapted into the International Phonetic Alphabet (IPA) in use today. A conversion of the palaeotype to the modern IPA was made in 1969.

== Appraisal ==
Joseph Wright initially questioned the value of Ellis's dialect tests, given what Ellis had recorded from Wright's home village of Windhill, West Riding of Yorkshire. He later praised the work in English Dialect Grammar, calling it a "monumental work" that had been "invaluable for checking and supplementing my own material". Peter Anderson later said that Wright had done Ellis "a disservice" in his assessment of the Windhill dialect test, as the differences were within the realm of what different linguists would transcribe. Kökeritz wrote that a word-for-word comparison showed that Wright took most of his Suffolk data from A. J. Ellis.

Eugen Dieth, a co-founder of the Survey of English Dialects, referred to the book as "a tragedy" that "every dialectologist consults, but, more often than not, rejects as inaccurate and wrong", and to the palaeotype as "often incomprehensible and defies all reasonable interpretation". This assessment has since been rejected as unfair by linguists such as K.M. Petyt, Graham Shorrocks and Warren Maguire. The other co-founder of the SED, Harold Orton, gave a more favourable assessment than Dieth, describing the work as an "astonishing publication far in advance of anything similar anywhere" but also as "defective and unreliable". Anderson has argued that the results of the SED in Yorkshire map closely on to A.J. Ellis's results, and the few discrepancies can be explained through linguistic changes over time. In A Structural Atlas of the English Dialects, Anderson produced comparable maps of Ellis's work and the SED for England as a whole.

Peter Trudgill has praised A. J. Ellis's work as pioneering. In 2004, Trudgill used the data to trace the origins of New Zealand English, using it as an indication for the language spoken at the time that New Zealand was colonised by British settlers.

Gerald Knowles saw A. J. Ellis's work as the first acknowledgement of a Scouse (Liverpool) dialect, distinct from the rest of Lancashire, although A. J. Ellis considered Scouse to be "no dialect proper". An article in the Transactions of the Yorkshire Dialect Society noted that A. J. Ellis also excluded Brummie, Mackem and several dialects that showed influence of Irish influence, yet he included Cockney, which had been influenced by waves of immigrants, and the speech of the Isle of Man and Cornwall, which had only adopted English relatively recently in history. A. J. Ellis seemed to be under the misunderstanding that most of Ireland was still Irish-speaking at the time of his research, but some parts of Ulster had abandoned Irish centuries earlier.

== Bibliography ==
- Anderson, Peter M. (1977). "A NEW LIGHT ON EARLY ENGLISH PRONUNCIATION". Transactions of the Yorkshire Dialect Society. 14 (77): 32–41.
- Anderson, Peter M. (1987). A Structural Atlas of the English Dialects. Croom Helm.
- Aveyard, Edward (2022). "What is Dialect?". Transactions of the Yorkshire Dialect Society. 23 (122): 25–36.
- Dieth, Eugen (1946). "A New Survey of English Dialects". Essays and Studies. 32: 76.
- Eustace, S.S. (November 1969). "THE MEANING OF THE PALAEOTYPE IN A. J. ELLIS'S ON EARLY ENGLISH PRONUNCIATION 1869–89". Transactions of the Philological Society. 68 (1): 31–79. doi:10.1111/j.1467-968X.1969.tb01264.x.
- Fryd, Marc (2011). "An Overview of Definite Article Reduction in Northern Varieties of English" (PDF). Cercles. 20: 82–96.
- Knowles, Gerald (1973). Scouse: the urban dialect of Liverpool (PhD). University of Leeds.
- Kökeritz, Helge (1932). Phonology of the Suffolk Dialect (Thesis). Uppsala.
- Maguire, Warren (August 2003). ""Mr. A. J. Ellis – the pioneer of scientific phonetics in England" (Sweet 1877, vii): an examination of Ellis's data from the northeast of England" (PDF). University of Edinburgh.
- Orton, Harold (1949). "The Study of Dialectical English". The Leeds Magazine. 1.
- Petyt, Keith Malcolm (1980). The Study of Dialect: An introduction to dialectology. Andre Deutsch. ISBN 0233972129.
- Shorrocks, Graham (1991). "A. J. Ellis as Dialectologist: A Reassessment". Historiographia Linguistica. XVIII: 2/3. doi:10.1075/hl.18.2-3.05sho.
- Trudgill, Peter (2004). New-dialect Formation: The Inevitability of Colonial Englishes. Oxford University Press. ISBN 9780195220438.
- Wright, Joseph (1892). A Grammar of the Dialect of Windhill. London: Truebner & Co.
