= African Reference Alphabet =

Defunct orthographic guideline for Africa

The African Reference Alphabet is a largely defunct continent-wide guideline for the creation of Latin alphabets for African languages. Two variants of the initial proposal (one in English and a second in French) were made at a 1978 UNESCO-organized conference held in Niamey, Niger. They were based on the results of several earlier conferences on the harmonization of established Latin alphabets of individual languages. The 1978 conference recommended the use of single letters for speech sounds rather than of letter sequences or of letters with diacritics. A substantial overhaul was proposed in 1982 but was rejected in a follow-up conference held in Niamey in 1984. Since then, continent-wide harmonization has been largely abandoned, because regional needs, practices and thus preferences differ greatly across Africa.

Through the individual languages that were its basis, the African Reference Alphabet inherits from the Africa Alphabet and, like its predecessor, uses a number of IPA letters. The Niamey conference built on the work of a previous UNESCO-organized meeting, on harmonizing the transcriptions of African languages, that was held in Bamako, Mali, in 1966.

== 1978 proposals ==
Separate versions of the conference's report were produced in English and French. Different images of the alphabet were used in the two versions, and there are a number of differences between the two.

The English version was a set of 57 letters, given in both upper-case and lower-case forms. Eight of these are formed from common Latin letters with the addition of an underline. Some (the uppercase letters alpha, eth, esh, and both lower- and upper-case,) cannot be accurately represented in Unicode (as of version 15, 2023). Others do not correspond to the upper- and lower-case identities in Unicode, or (e.g. Ʒ, Ʃ) require character variants in the font.

This version also listed eight diacritical marks (acute accent (´), grave accent (`), circumflex (ˆ), caron (ˇ), macron (¯), tilde (˜), trema (¨), and a superscript dot (˙) and nine punctuation marks (? ! ( ) « » , ; .).

The letters presented in the Annex 1 of the 1978 Niamey meeting report are slightly different from the ones presented on page 34 (page 32 in the French version) which omitted the hooktop-z but included two apostrophe-like letters (for ʔ and ʕ). Five of the letters were written with a subscript dot instead of an underline as in the English version (namely ḍ ḥ ṣ ṭ and ẓ). The French and English sets are otherwise identical.

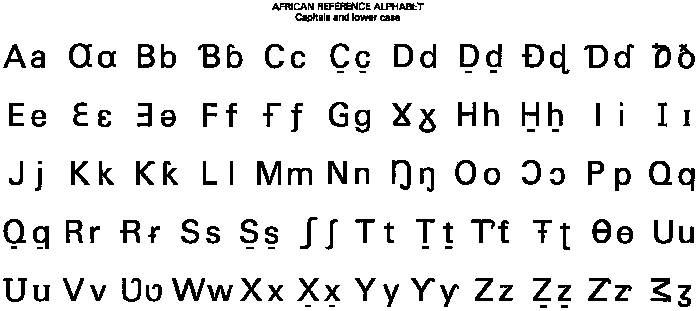
African Reference Alphabet, as presented on the 1978 Niamey conference Annex 1 (printed English version)

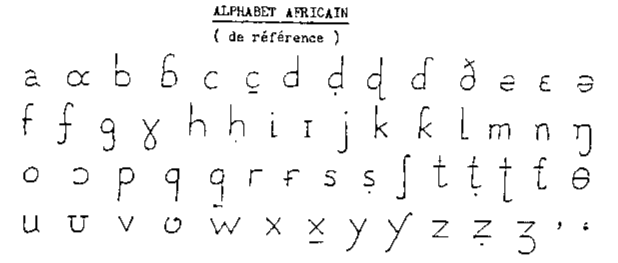
African Reference Alphabet, as presented on the 1978 Niamey conference (handwritten French version)

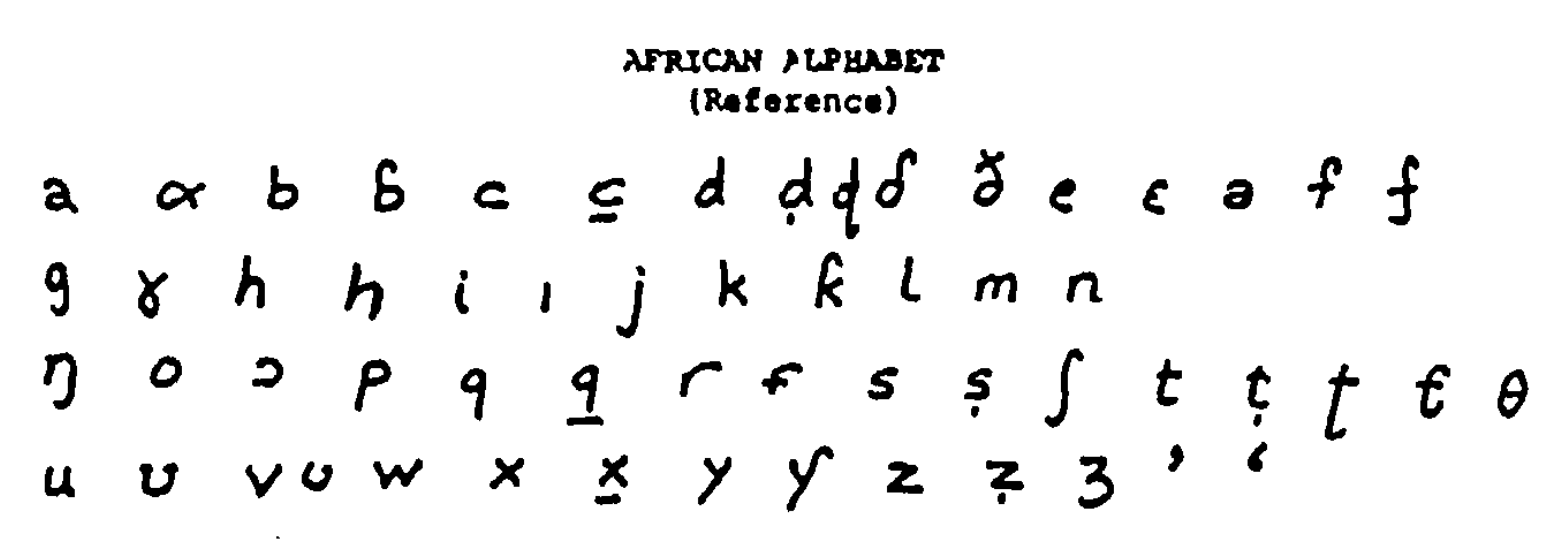
African Reference Alphabet, as presented on the 1978 Niamey conference (handwritten English version)

English variant of 1978 proposal
Aa	Ɑɑ	Bb	Ɓɓ	Cc		C̠c̠	Dd	Ḍḍ	Ɖɖ	Ɗɗ	ð
Ee	Ɛɛ	Ǝǝ	Ff	Ғƒ		Gg	Ɣɣ	Hh	Ḥḥ	Ii	Ɪɪ
Jj	Kk	Ƙƙ	Ll	Mm		Nn	Ŋŋ	Oo	Ɔɔ	Pp	Qq
Q̠q̠	Rr	Ɍɍ	Ss	Ṣṣ	Ʃʃ	Tt	Ṭṭ	Ƭƭ	Ŧʈ	ϴө	Uu
Ʊʊ	Vv	Ʋʋ	Ww	Xx	X̠x̠	Yy	Ƴƴ	Zz	Ẓẓ		Ʃʒ

Notes:

- ⟨Ɑ ɑ⟩ is graphically closer to lowercase Greek alpha ⟨ ⟩ rather than Latin script a ⟨ ⟩. In Unicode, Latin alpha and script a are not considered to be separate characters.
- The uppercase ⟨I i⟩ does not have crossbars ⟨⟩, while the uppercase ⟨Ɪ ɪ⟩ does ⟨⟩.
- The penultimate z with tophook ⟨⟩ is not encoded in Unicode.
- ⟨c̠, q̠, x̠⟩ represent click consonants (/ǀ, ǃ, ǁ/ respectively), but the line under is optional, and usually not used.
- The pharyngeal ⟨ḥ⟩ and pharyngealized ⟨ḍ, ṣ, ṭ, ẓ⟩ are presented with lines below as ⟨h̠⟩ and ⟨d̠, s̠, t̠, z̠⟩ in the Annex 1 but with dots in the other parts of the 1978 Niamey meeting report (both in the French and English versions). These represent Arabic-style emphatic consonants.
- ⟨c, j⟩ represent either palatal stops /c, ɟ/ or postalveolar affricates /tʃ, dʒ/.
- ⟨ʈ, ɖ⟩ are retroflex stops, as they are in the IPA.
- ⟨ƒ, ʋ⟩ represent bilabial fricatives /ɸ, β/.
- ⟨ө⟩ is a dental fricative /θ/, not a vowel.
- Although digraphs using ⟨h⟩ are normally used to represent aspirated consonants, in languages in which those are absent, the digraphs can be used instead of ⟨ʒ, ʃ, ө, ɣ⟩ etc.
- Digraphs with ⟨m, n⟩ are used for prenasalized consonants.
- Digraphs with ⟨w, y⟩ are used for labialized and palatalized consonants.
- ⟨kp, gb⟩ are used for labial–velar stops, as they are in the IPA.
- ⟨hl, dl⟩ are used for lateral fricatives /ɬ, ɮ/.
- ⟨ɓ, ɗ⟩ are used for implosives, and ⟨ƭ, ƙ⟩ for either ejectives or voiceless implosives. ⟨ƴ⟩ is used for a glottalized or laryngealized approximant /ˀj/.
- Nasal vowels are written either with a nasal consonant after the vowel, or with a tilde above it.
- Tone is indicated using the acute accent, grave accent, caron, macron, and circumflex.
- A trema is used for centralized vowels, and vowel length is indicated by doubling the vowel (e.g. ⟨aa⟩ for /aː/).
- Segmentation should be done according to each language's own phonology and morphology.

== Rejected 1982 proposal ==
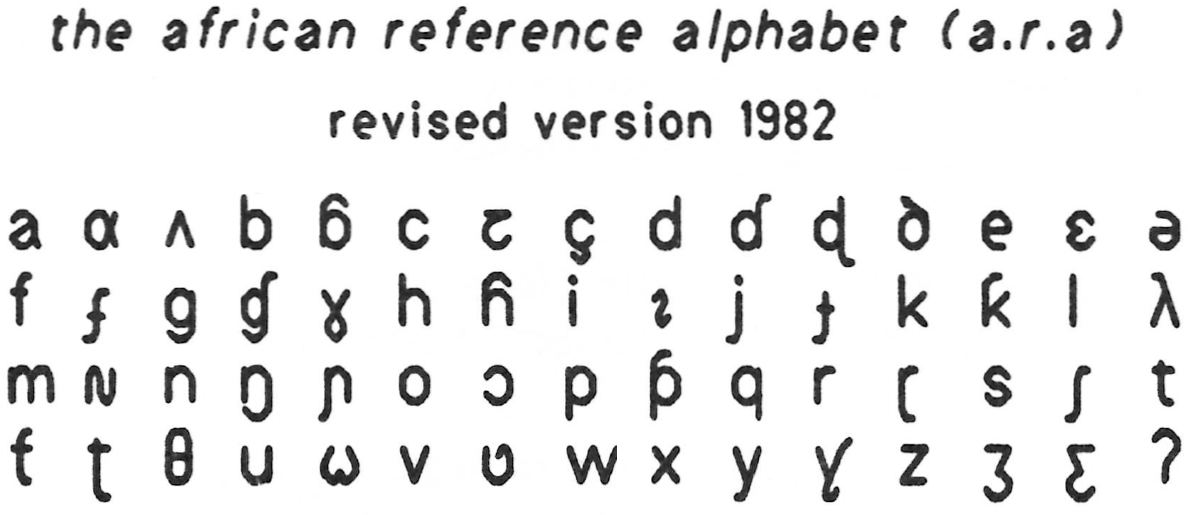
African Reference Alphabet (revised version 1982) as proposed by Michael Mann and David Dalby

A proposed revision of the alphabet was made in 1982 by Michael Mann and David Dalby, who had attended the Niamey conference. It had 60 letters. Digraphs were retained only for vowel length and geminate consonants, and even there replacements are suggested. A key feature of this proposal is that, like the French proposal of 1978, it did not have capital letters. Because no language has all the consonants, the consonant letters were proposed for more than one potential value, being reassigned when there were conflicts. For instance, ⟨ɦ⟩ was proposed as a voiceless pharyngeal /ħ/, a voiced glottal fricative /ɦ/, and even an alveolar nasal click /ŋǃ/, depending on the language.

Mann & Dalby's revised African Reference Alphabet
a	ɑ	ʌ	b	ɓ	c	ꞇ	ç	d	ɗ	ɖ	ꝺ	e	ɛ	ǝ
f	ƒ	g	ɠ	ɣ	h	ɦ	i	ɩ	j	ɟ	k	ƙ	l	λ
m		n	ŋ	ɲ	o	ɔ	p	ƥ	q	r	ɽ	s	ʃ	t
ƭ	ʈ	θ	u	ω	v	ʋ	w	x	y	ƴ	z	ʒ	ƹ	ʔ

The proposal did not meet with acceptance at the follow-up Niamey meeting in 1984.

== See also ==
- Africa Alphabet
- Dinka alphabet
- General Alphabet of Cameroon Languages
- ISO 6438
- Pan-Nigerian alphabet
- Lepsius Standard Alphabet
