= Romic alphabet =

Phonetic alphabet proposed by Henry Sweet

- Script type: Alphabet
- Creator: Henry Sweet
- Period: 19th century
- Languages: various

Related scripts
- Parent systems: Egyptian hieroglyphs: Proto-Sinaitic script; Phoenician alphabet; Greek alphabet; Latin script; Lepsius Standard Alphabet; Palaeotype alphabet, English Phonotypic Alphabet; Romic alphabet
- Child systems: International Phonetic Alphabet

The Romic Alphabet, sometimes known as the Romic Reform, is a phonetic alphabet proposed by Henry Sweet. It descends from Ellis's Palaeotype alphabet and English Phonotypic Alphabet, and is the direct ancestor of the International Phonetic Alphabet. In Romic every sound had a dedicated symbol, and every symbol represented a single sound. There were no capital letters; there were letters derived from small capitals, though these were distinct letters.

There were two variants, Broad Romic and Narrow Romic. Narrow Romic utilized italics to distinguish fine details of pronunciation; Broad Romic was cruder, and in it the vowels had their English "short" sounds when written singly, and their "long" sounds when doubled:

If the beginner has once learnt to pronounce a, e, i, o, u, as in glass, bet, bit, not, dull, he simply has to remember that long vowels are doubled, as in biit—"beat", and fuul—"fool", and diphthongs formed by the juxtaposition of their elements, as in boi—"boy" and hai—"high" [...]

Sweet adopted from Ellis and earlier philologists a method creating new letters by rotating existing ones, as in this way no new type would need to be cast:

There is, however, one simple method of forming new letters without casting new types, which is very often convenient. This is by turning the letters, thus - ə, ɔ. These new letters are perfectly distinct in shape, and are easily written. The ə was first employed by Schmeller to denote the final e-sound in the German gabe, &c. Mr. Ellis, in his 'Palæotype,' uses it to denote the allied English sound in but.

— Henry Sweet, A Handbook of Phonetics, 1877, p. 175

The IPA letter ⟨ɔ⟩ acquired its modern pronunciation and first use with this alphabet. He resurrected three Anglo-Saxon letters, ash ⟨æ⟩, eth ⟨ð⟩ and thorn ⟨þ⟩, the first two of which had the pronunciations they retain in the IPA.

== Tables ==
The following tables outline consonants and vowels as laid out in A Primer of Phonetics (1892: 38).

=== Consonants ===
| | Labial | Labiodental | Dental | Alveolar | Postalveolar | Palatal | Velar | Labiovelar | Pharyngeal | Glottal |
|---|---|---|---|---|---|---|---|---|---|---|
| Nasal | mℎ · m | | | nℎ · n | | ñℎ · ñ | ŋℎ · ŋ | | | |
| Plosive | p · b | | | t · d | | c · ɟ | k · g | | | (ʼ)? |
| Fricative/ Approximant | ϕ · β | f · v | þ · ð | s · z | ʃ · ʒ | ç · j | x · ᵹ | ʍ · w | ɹℎ · ɹ | h · |
| Lateral | | | | lℎ · l | | λℎ · λ | ꞁℎ · ꞁ | | | |
| Rhotic | | | | rℎ · r | | | | | | |

⟨ñ ᵹ ɹ λ ꞁ þ⟩ were eventually replaced with ⟨ɲ ɣ ʕ ʎ ʟ θ⟩ in the IPA. Apart from Sweet's use of italic ℎ for voicelessness, the rest of the alphabet continues intact in the modern IPA.

=== Vowels ===
In "wide" vowels, the tongue is described as relaxed and flattened; in "narrow", it is tense and more convex. This corresponds to descriptions of vowels as lax and tense. Lax vowels are indicated by italic type. In the case of the mid back unrounded vowel ⟨a⟩, the description of its place of articulation does not accord well with some of the words given as examples. Sweet described vowels as narrowed with the tongue raised as in high vowels, but the jaw open as in low vowels. This conflicts with the presentation of the IPA, in which high and close are synonymous, as are low and open. Other than the back unrounded vowels and the value of ⟨ə⟩ for IPA [ø] (but also for English bird, in broad notation), Sweet's notation is essentially that of the IPA.

Tense vowels (italicize for lax vowels)
| | Front | Central | Back |
|---|---|---|---|
| High | i · y | ï · ü | ʌ · u |
| Mid | e · ə | ë · ö | a· o |
| Low | æ · œ | ä · ɔ̈ | ɐ · ɔ |

Italic a takes its traditional shape, which would later be made distinct in the IPA. That is, italic a was ⟨ɑ⟩, and italic ɐ, ⟨ɒ⟩. Long vowels are written double. Nasal vowels with an italic nasal consonant letter, such as ⟨a𝑛⟩ or (for French) ⟨aŋ⟩.

These are defined by Sweet as:

⟨i⟩: French si, ⟨e⟩: German See, Scots say, ⟨æ⟩: Swedish lära
⟨y⟩: French lune, ⟨ə⟩: French peu, ⟨œ⟩: Swedish för
⟨ï⟩: Welsh un, ⟨ë⟩: German Gabe, ⟨ä⟩: English sir
⟨ü⟩: Norwegian hus, ...
⟨ʌ⟩: Gaelic laogh, ⟨a⟩: English but, ⟨ɐ⟩: Cockney park
⟨u⟩: French sou, Scots book, ⟨o⟩: German so, ⟨ɔ⟩: English law

The lax vowels are defined by Sweet as:

⟨i⟩: English bit, ⟨e⟩: English men, ⟨æ⟩: English man
⟨ə⟩: French peur, ⟨œ⟩: (German götter is overrounded œ)
⟨ï⟩: English pretty, ⟨ë⟩: start of English eye, better, ⟨ɑ̈⟩: start of English how, Portuguese cama
⟨ü⟩: English value, ⟨ő⟩: French homme
⟨ɑ⟩: English father, ⟨ɒ⟩: Swedish mat
⟨u⟩: English put, ⟨o⟩: German stock, English boy, ⟨ɔ⟩: English not

== History ==
The 1877 version of the Romic alphabet differed rather substantially from the 1892 version. It was very similar to Ellis's Paleotype.

=== Vowels ===
Central vowels were indicated with a non-italic 'h' rather than a diaeresis, with regular ⟨æh⟩ for later irregular ⟨ä⟩.

The unrounded back vowels were irregular in their composition, in that laxness was not indicated by italicizing, which was used instead for the low vowels. They were (tense) high ⟨Ɐ⟩, mid ⟨ɐ⟩ (English but), low ⟨ɒ⟩ and (lax) high ⟨ᴀ⟩, mid ⟨a⟩ (English father) and low ⟨ɑ⟩ (Scots father).

⟨ʌ⟩ was used for the unstressed English schwa. It was not listed in the vowel chart because it was not considered to have any particular articulation, being merely an independent element of voicing (what Sweet called a 'glide vowel'), and the voiced equivalent of unarticulated ⟨ʜ⟩ (which would later become ⟨h⟩). ⟨ʜh⟩ is an open glottis, ⟨ʌh⟩ (or ⟨ʻʌ⟩) a whispery glottis.

Nasal vowels were indicated with a following italic 𝑛, the French "guttural" nasals with a following italic 𝑞, as in ⟨a𝑛⟩ and ⟨a𝑞⟩.

Vowel length was indicated with a following ⟨ɪ⟩ rather than doubling, as in ⟨aɪ⟩ (or extra-long ⟨aɪɪ⟩).

Reduced or barely pronounced sounds were marked by brackets, so ⟨[i]⟩.

Indices were used to avoid complex detail when it would be understood, as ⟨e^{1}, o^{1}⟩ for English diphthongal [eɪ, oʊ]

=== Consonants ===
Glottal stop was x, the velar nasal q. Digraphs were used where later Sweet would use distinct characters.

| | Lab. | Lab-D. | Dent. | Alv. | Palv. | Pal. | Velar | Labv. | Phar. | Glot. |
|---|---|---|---|---|---|---|---|---|---|---|
| Nasal | mh · m | | | nh · n | | ɴh · ɴ | qh · q | | | |
| Plosive | p · b | | | t · d | | ᴛ · ᴅ | k · g | | | x |
| Fric./approx. | ph · bh | f · v | th · dh | s · z rh · r | sh · zh | jh · j | kh · gh | wh · w | ʀh · ʀ | ʜ · ʌ |
| Lateral | | | | lh · l | | ʟh · ʟ | Ꞁh · Ꞁ | | | |

⟨ʜ⟩ and ⟨ʌ⟩ (IPA [h] and [ə]) might both be considered vowels, without any particular place of articulation, though at least [h] can sometimes behave as a glottal consonant.

English ch and j sounds were written ⟨tsh⟩ and ⟨dzh⟩. ⟨r⟩ was specifically an English [ɹ].

==== Modifications of consonants ====
Consonants took diacritics for fronting, as in dental ⟨t̖⟩, or retraction, as in uvular ⟨k̗⟩, retroflection, as in ⟨t⸸⟩, and protrusion, as in interdental ⟨t†⟩.

Where the IPA uses superscript letters for secondary articulation, Sweet used italics. Labialization and palatalization were indicated by a following italic ⟨w⟩ and ⟨j⟩. An italic ⟨r⟩ was used for trills, e.g. Italian ⟨rr⟩ (and voiceless Welsh ⟨rhr⟩), German ⟨ghr⟩, bilabial ⟨bhr⟩, and epiglottal ⟨ʀr⟩ and ⟨ʀhr⟩ as in Arabic ain and heth.

Aspiration was marked with ⟨ʜ⟩. (This was not italicized, but would be later when replaced with ℎ.) Whispered sounds were marked e.g. ⟨‘z⟩.

Simultaneous articulation was marked with *, as in ⟨k*p⟩.

As with vowels, barely articulated or pronounced consonants were set off with [brackets].

Much of the notation for phonetic detail may have carried over into later versions.

=== Stress and pitch ===
Stress is indicated with a ⟨·⟩ placed after the onset of the syllable, as in ⟨t·rehih⟩ 'try' (⟨ʌt·rehih⟩ 'a try' vs ⟨ʌtr·ehih⟩ 'at Rye'). Extra stress was marked with doubled ⟨··⟩, half stress with ⟨:⟩. Increasing, level, and decreasing stress (illustrated with the letter 'a') were ⟨a᷾⟩, ⟨ā̄⟩, ⟨a͐⟩ respectively.

Tone and intonation were indicated with iconic symbols such as rising ⟨/⟩, falling ⟨\⟩, level ⟨−⟩, rising-falling ⟨^⟩, etc., as in early IPA usage.

== See also ==
- History of the IPA

== Bibliography ==
- Sweet, Henry. (1892) A Primer of Phonetics, Oxford: Clarendon Press. (archive.org)
- Sweet, Henry. (1877) A Handbook of Phonetics, Including a Popular Exposition of the Principles of Spelling Reform, Oxford: Clarendon Press. (archive.org)
