= Pan-Nigerian alphabet =

Set of 33 Latin letters used to write Nigerian languages

The Pan-Nigerian alphabet is a set of 33 Latin letters standardised by the National Language Centre of Nigeria in the 1980s. It is intended to be sufficient to write all the languages of Nigeria without using digraphs.

== History ==
Several hundred different languages are spoken in Nigeria. The different Latin alphabets made it impractical to create Nigerian typewriters. In the 1980s the National Language Centre (NLC) undertook to develop a single alphabet suitable for writing all the languages of the country, and replacing use of Arabic script, taking as its starting point a model proposed by linguist Kay Williamson in 1981. A typeface was developed in 1985–1986 by Edward Oguejofor and Victor Manfredi, in co-operation with the NLC, with technical assistance from Hermann Zapf.

== Characters ==
Aa	Bb	Ɓɓ	Cc	Dd	Ɗɗ	Ee	Ǝǝ	Ẹẹ	Ff	Gg
Hh	Ii	Ịị	Jj	Kk	Ƙƙ	Ll	Mm	Nn	Oo	Ọọ
Pp	Rr	Ss	Ṣṣ	Tt	Uu	Ụụ	Vv	Ww	Yy	Zz

The acute ( ´ ), grave ( ` ) and circumflex ( ˆ ) accents are also used to mark High, Low, and Falling tone respectively. Mid tone (in languages which contrast High, Mid, and Low) is left unmarked.

== Keyboard ==
A typewriter keyboard was produced for the NLC by Olivetti:

ˆ ˊ	" 2	/ 3	− 4	₦ 5 €	= 6	_ 7	ǀ 8	( 9	) ?	Ɲ	Ɪ			⌫ Backspace
↹ Tab	Q	W	E	R	T	Y	U	I	O	P	Ụ	Ị		
⇫ Caps Lock	A	S	D	F _	G	H	J _	K	L	Ọ	Ẹ		Ạ	↲ Enter
⇧ Shift		Z	X	C	V	B	N	M	Ñ	Ŋ	Ṣ	⇧ Shift		
Ctrl	⊞	Alt	Space bar						Alt Gr		Fn	≡		Ctrl

On this typewriter keyboard layout the letters Q and X were not mapped as they were not part of the alphabet, and digits 0 or 1 had to be entered as capital letters O and I. Keys in grey (for modern computers) were missing.

On modern keyboard for computers, the distinctive digits 0 and 1 are placed on the unshifted positions of keys of first row (like other digits), the letter Q is mapped like on standard QWERTY layouts, but dead keys at start of the first and second row need to be moved to the 102nd key on start of the first row (reducing the width of the left shift key), and to the shifted position of the new key assigned to digit 0 on the first row.

In all cases, the Enter key may vary between this L-shaped key on two rows, and the horizontal key on the third row only (moving the key assigned to letter Ǝ to the end of the second row).

=== Mobile devices ===
Some onscreen smartphone keyboards like Swiftkey, Touchpal, Multiling and African keyboards have full support for Pan-Nigerian alphabets.

== See also ==
- General Alphabet of Cameroon Languages
- Africa Alphabet
- African Reference Alphabet
- Dinka alphabet
- ISO 6438
- Lepsius Standard Alphabet
- Vietnamese alphabet
