= Africa Alphabet =

Letters created for African languages

African Alphabet
- Script type: alphabet
- Period: 1928–present
- Languages: Languages of Africa

The Africa Alphabet (also International African Alphabet or IAI alphabet) is a set of letters designed as the basis for Latin alphabets for the languages of Africa. It was initially developed in 1928 by the International Institute of African Languages and Cultures by combining the English alphabet with some letters from the International Phonetic Alphabet (IPA). Development was assisted by native speakers of African languages and led by Diedrich Hermann Westermann, who served as director of the organization from 1926 to 1939. The aim of the International Institute of African Languages and Cultures, later renamed the International African Institute (IAI), was to enable people to write for practical and scientific purposes in all African languages without the need of diacritics.

The Africa Alphabet influenced the development of orthographies for many African languages, serving "as the basis for the transcription" of about 60 by one count. Discussion of how to harmonize these with other systems led to several largely abortive proposals such as the African Reference Alphabet and the World Orthography.

== Overview ==
The Africa Alphabet was built from the consonant letters of the English alphabet with the vowel letters and additional consonants of the IPA. Capital forms of IPA letters were invented as necessary. Thus J and Y are pronounced [d͡ʒ] and [j] as in English, while Ɔ, Ɛ and Ŋ are pronounced [ɔ], [ɛ] and [ŋ] as in the IPA.

== Characters ==
International African Alphabet
Aa	Bb	Ɓɓ (Note: The capital Ɓ has the form of Ƃ in the original document, which is not the current standard in most languages, but is still preferred for Dan and Kpelle languages of Liberia. Some fonts, such as Gentium, provide for this via character variants.)	Cc	Dd	Ɖɖ	Ee	Ɛɛ	Əə	Ff	Ƒƒ	Gg
Ɣɣ	Hh	Xx	Ii	Jj	Kk	Ll	Mm	Nn	Ŋŋ	Oo	Ɔɔ
Pp	Rr	Ss	Ʃʃ	Tt	Uu	Vv	Ʋʋ	Ww	Yy	Zz	Ʒʒ (Note: In the original document, the capital ⟨Ʒ⟩ has the form of a reversed ⟨Σ⟩, as in ⟨Σ⟩, which is still preferred for Dagbani language in Ghana. Some fonts, such as Gentium, provide for this via character variants.)

== See also ==
- African Reference Alphabet
- Latin-script alphabet
- Dinka alphabet
- ISO 6438
- Pan-Nigerian alphabet
- General Alphabet of Cameroon Languages
- Lepsius Standard Alphabet
- Writing systems of Africa
