= World Orthography =

Alphabet and transcription system

- Script type: alphabet
- Period: Invented 1948

The World Orthography (WO) is an abortive alphabet and transcription system based on the Africa Alphabet and the International Phonetic Alphabet. In Daniel Jones’s 1948 Difference between Spoken and Written Language, an adaptation of WO for English is given with the letters a b c d ð e ə f g h i j k l m n ŋ o p r s ʃ t θ u v w x y z ʒ. The capitals of ð, ə, ŋ, ʃ, θ, and ʒ are: Ð (shaped like Ƌ), Ə, Ŋ (shaped like large ŋ), Ʃ (shaped like sigma Σ), Θ, and straight-bottomed Ʒ (shaped like reversed sigma).

== Examples ==
English sample from Jones 1948:

Ðis paragraf ʃouz hwot Iŋgliʃ luks laik in wən form ov Wərld Orθografi. It wil bi noutist ðat it iz not posibəl tu yuz for pərposəz ov speliŋ ən egzakt reprezənteiʃon ov ði spic ov eni wən Iŋgliʃ-spiikiŋ gruup, bət ðat veiriəs adapteiʃonz hav tu bi meid in ordər tu rendər ðə speliŋ yuzəbəl bai ool sekʃonz ov ði Iŋgliʃ-spiikiŋ wərld. For instans, it iz probabli advaizabəl tu meik ði leter ə du dyuti for ði saund ʌ as wel az for ði saund ə, in akordans wið ði spiic ov meni in ði Norθ ov Iŋglənd and in Amerika hu du not distiŋgwiʃ ðiiz saundz. Laikwaiz it wil nou daut bi faund konviinien tu rait moust ov ði ənstrest ə-saundz wið ðeir prezənt speliŋz, sins ðei sou ofən ʃou releiʃonʃips tu aðər wərdz, az in pedant, pedantik, provident, providenʃal, meθod, meθodikal. Əgein it wil oolmoust sərtenli bi faund advanteijəs tu introdyus ə sərten nambər ov “wərd sainz” tu denout ʃort komon wərdz wið veiriabəl pronənsieʃion, for instəns a, ði, bi, mi, ʃi, du, tu, hu. A limited nambər ov wərdz wud hav oltərnativ speliŋz, e.g. pas, paas, grant, graant, soolt, solt, agein, agen, wið, wiθ.

In Normal English:

"This paragraph shows what English looks like in one form of World Orthography. It will be noticed that it is not possible to use for purposes of spelling an exact representation of the speech of any one English-speaking group, but that various adaptations have to be made in order to render the spelling usable by all sections of the English-speaking world. For instance, it is probably advisable to make the letter ə do duty for the sound ʌ as well as for the sound ə, in accordance with the speech of many in the North of England and in America who do not distinguish these sounds. Likewise, it will no doubt be found convenient to write most of the unstressed ə sounds with their present spellings, since they so often show relationships to other words, as in pedant, pedantic, provident, providential, method, methodical. Again, it will almost certainly be found advantageous to introduce a certain number of 'word signs' to denote short common words with variable pronunciation, for instance a, the, be, me, she, do, to, who. A limited number of words would have alternative spellings, e.g. pass, pass, grant, grant, salt, salt, again, again, with, with."

== See also ==
- Africa Alphabet
- Latin-script alphabet
- International Phonetic Alphabet
- Lepsius Standard Alphabet

== Notes ==
Place →	Labial					Coronal										Dorsal					Laryngeal			
Manner ↓	Bilabial		Labiodental		Linguolabial		Dental		Alveolar		Postalveolar		Retroflex		(Alveolo-)palatal		Velar		Uvular		Pharyngeal/epiglottal		Glottal	
Nasal	m̥	m	ɱ̊	ɱ		n̼	n̪̊	n̪	n̥	n	n̠̊	n̠	ɳ̊	ɳ	ɲ̊	ɲ	ŋ̊	ŋ	ɴ̥	ɴ				
Plosive	p	b	p̪	b̪	t̼	d̼	t̪	d̪	t	d			ʈ	ɖ	c	ɟ	k	ɡ	q	ɢ	ʡ		ʔ	
Sibilant affricate							t̪s̪	d̪z̪	ts	dz	t̠ʃ	d̠ʒ	tʂ	dʐ	tɕ	dʑ								
Non-sibilant affricate	pɸ	bβ	p̪f	b̪v			t̪θ	d̪ð	tɹ̝̊	dɹ̝	t̠ɹ̠̊˔	d̠ɹ̠˔			cç	ɟʝ	kx	ɡɣ	qχ	ɢʁ	ʡʜ	ʡʢ	ʔh	
Sibilant fricative							s̪	z̪	s	z	ʃ	ʒ	ʂ	ʐ	ɕ	ʑ								
Non-sibilant fricative	ɸ	β	f	v	θ̼	ð̼	θ	ð	θ̠	ð̠	ɹ̠̊˔	ɹ̠˔	ɻ̊˔	ɻ˔	ç	ʝ	x	ɣ	χ	ʁ	ħ	ʕ	h	ɦ
Approximant		β̞		ʋ				ð̞		ɹ		ɹ̠		ɻ		j		ɰ						˷
Tap/flap		ⱱ̟		ⱱ					ɾ̥	ɾ			ɽ̊	ɽ						ɢ̆		ʡ̮		
Trill	ʙ̥	ʙ							r̥	r		r̠	ɽ̊r̥	ɽr					ʀ̥	ʀ	ʜ	ʢ		
Lateral affricate									tɬ	dɮ			tꞎ	d𝼅	c𝼆	ɟʎ̝	k𝼄	ɡʟ̝						
Lateral fricative							ɬ̪		ɬ	ɮ			ꞎ	𝼅	𝼆	ʎ̝	𝼄	ʟ̝						
Lateral approximant								l̪	l̥	l		l̠	ɭ̊	ɭ	ʎ̥	ʎ	ʟ̥	ʟ		ʟ̠				
Lateral tap/flap									ɺ̥	ɺ			𝼈̊	𝼈		ʎ̮		ʟ̆						

		BL	LD	D	A	PA	RF	P	V	U
Implosive	Voiced	ɓ			ɗ		ᶑ	ʄ	ɠ	ʛ
Implosive	Voiceless	ɓ̥			ɗ̥		ᶑ̊	ʄ̊	ɠ̊	ʛ̥
Ejective	Stop	pʼ			tʼ		ʈʼ	cʼ	kʼ	qʼ
Ejective	Affricate		p̪fʼ	t̪θʼ	tsʼ	t̠ʃʼ	tʂʼ	tɕʼ	kxʼ	qχʼ
Ejective	Fricative	ɸʼ	fʼ	θʼ	sʼ	ʃʼ	ʂʼ	ɕʼ	xʼ	χʼ
Ejective	Lateral affricate				tɬʼ			c𝼆ʼ	k𝼄ʼ	q𝼄ʼ
Ejective	Lateral fricative				ɬʼ					
Click (top: velar; bottom: uvular)	Tenuis	kʘ qʘ		kǀ qǀ	kǃ qǃ		k𝼊 q𝼊	kǂ qǂ		
Click (top: velar; bottom: uvular)	Voiced	ɡʘ ɢʘ		ɡǀ ɢǀ	ɡǃ ɢǃ		ɡ𝼊 ɢ𝼊	ɡǂ ɢǂ		
Click (top: velar; bottom: uvular)	Nasal	ŋʘ ɴʘ		ŋǀ ɴǀ	ŋǃ ɴǃ		ŋ𝼊 ɴ𝼊	ŋǂ ɴǂ	ʞ	
Click (top: velar; bottom: uvular)	Tenuis lateral				kǁ qǁ					
Click (top: velar; bottom: uvular)	Voiced lateral				ɡǁ ɢǁ					
Click (top: velar; bottom: uvular)	Nasal lateral				ŋǁ ɴǁ					
