= Latin theta =

Additional letter of the Latin alphabet

- ϴ θ

Usage
- Writing system: Latin script
- Type: Alphabetic and logographic
- Sound values: /θ/

History
- Development: 𐤈: Θ θ; ϴ θ

Other
- Writing direction: Left-to-right

Latin theta (uppercase: ϴ, lowercase: θ) is an additional letter of the Latin script, based on the lowercase letter theta from the Greek alphabet. It is used in Cypriot Arabic, Gros Ventre, Comox, Fox, Thompson, Tuscarora, Halkomelem, Wakhi, Yavapai, Havasupai–Hualapai, and Romani. It also historically was used in the Lepsius Standard Alphabet.

== Usage ==
The letter appears in the International Standard Alphabet of the Romani language, where it represents a voiceless alveolar plosive [t] when placed after a vowel, and a voiced alveolar plosive [d] when placed after a nasal consonant.

In the Gros Ventre, Fox, and Comox languages, it represents a voiceless dental fricative [θ] sound. It was also used for this sound in the Lepsius Standard Alphabet, though was later replaced by the letter ⟨Ṯ⟩.

Latin theta is also found in Cypriot Arabic and the Latin script for the Wakhi language.

== Unicode ==
Latin theta is not encoded in the Unicode standard as of 2026 despite numerous proposals, with its addition anticipated to cause "significant disruption". Consequently, U+03F4 ϴ GREEK CAPITAL THETA SYMBOL (rarely normal capital Greek theta or U+019F Ɵ LATIN CAPITAL LETTER O WITH MIDDLE TILDE) is used for the capital and U+03B8 θ GREEK SMALL LETTER THETA for the lowercase. However, casing issues have been noted when substituting Greek letters.

== See also ==
- Tau gallicum, another Latin letter based on the Greek theta

== Bibliography ==
- Hancock, Ian (1995). A Handbook of Vlax Romani. Columbus, Ohio: Slavica Publishers. ISBN 0-89357-258-6.
