= Alexander John Ellis =

English mathematician and philologist (1814–1890)

Alexander John Ellis FRS
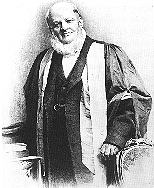
- Born: Alexander Sharpe; 14 June 1814; Hoxton, Middlesex, England
- Died: 28 October 1890 (aged 76); Kensington, London, England
- Education: Shrewsbury School, Eton College
- Alma mater: Trinity College, Cambridge
- Occupations: mathematician and philologist

Alexander John Ellis FRS (14 June 1814 – 28 October 1890) was an English mathematician, philologist and early phonetician who also influenced the field of musicology. He changed his name from his father's name, Sharpe, to his mother's maiden name, Ellis, in 1825 as a condition of receiving significant financial support from a relative on his mother's side. He is buried in Kensal Green Cemetery, London.

== Biography ==
He was born Alexander John Sharpe in Hoxton, Middlesex, to a wealthy family. His father, James Birch Sharpe, was a notable artist and physician who was later appointed Esquire of Windlesham. His mother, Ann Ellis, was from a noble background, but it is not known how her family made its fortune. Alexander's brother James Birch Sharpe junior died at the Battle of Inkerman during the Crimean War. His other brother, William Henry Sharpe, served with the Lancashire Fusiliers after moving north with his family to Cumberland, due to military work.

Alexander was educated at Shrewsbury School, Eton College and Trinity College, Cambridge (BA 1837). Initially trained in mathematics and the classics, he became a well-known phonetician of his time and wrote the article on phonetics for the Encyclopaedia Britannica in 1887. Through his work in phonetics, he also became interested in vocal pitch and, by extension, in musical pitch, as well as speech and song.

Ellis is noted for translating and extensively annotating Hermann von Helmholtz's On the Sensations of Tone. The second edition of this translation, published in 1885, contains an appendix which summarises Ellis's own work on related matters.

In his writings on musical pitch and scales, Ellis elaborates his notion and notation of cents for musical intervals. This concept became especially influential in comparative musicology, a predecessor of ethnomusicology. Analyzing the scales (tone systems) of various European musical traditions, Ellis also showed that the diversity of tone systems cannot be explained by a single physical law, as had been argued by earlier scholars.

In part V of his series On Early English Pronunciation, he distinguished forty-two different dialects in England and the Scottish Lowlands. This was one of the first works to apply phonetics to English speech and has been cited continuously by linguists since publication.

He was acknowledged by George Bernard Shaw as the prototype of Professor Henry Higgins of Pygmalion (adapted as the musical My Fair Lady). He was elected in June 1864 as a Fellow of the Royal Society.

Ellis's son Tristram James Ellis trained as an engineer, but later became a noted painter of the Middle East.

== Phonetic alphabets ==
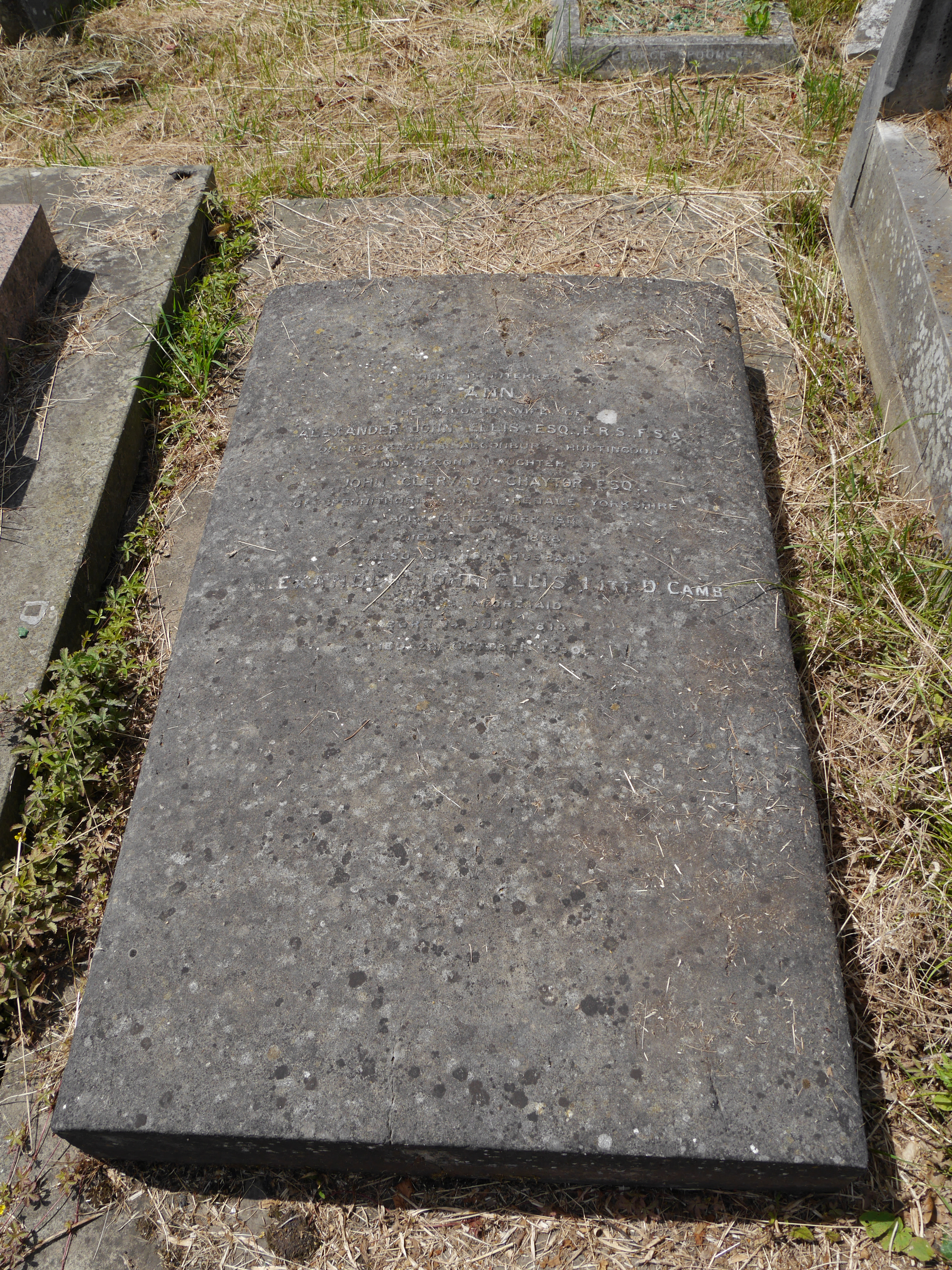
Monument, Kensal Green Cemetery

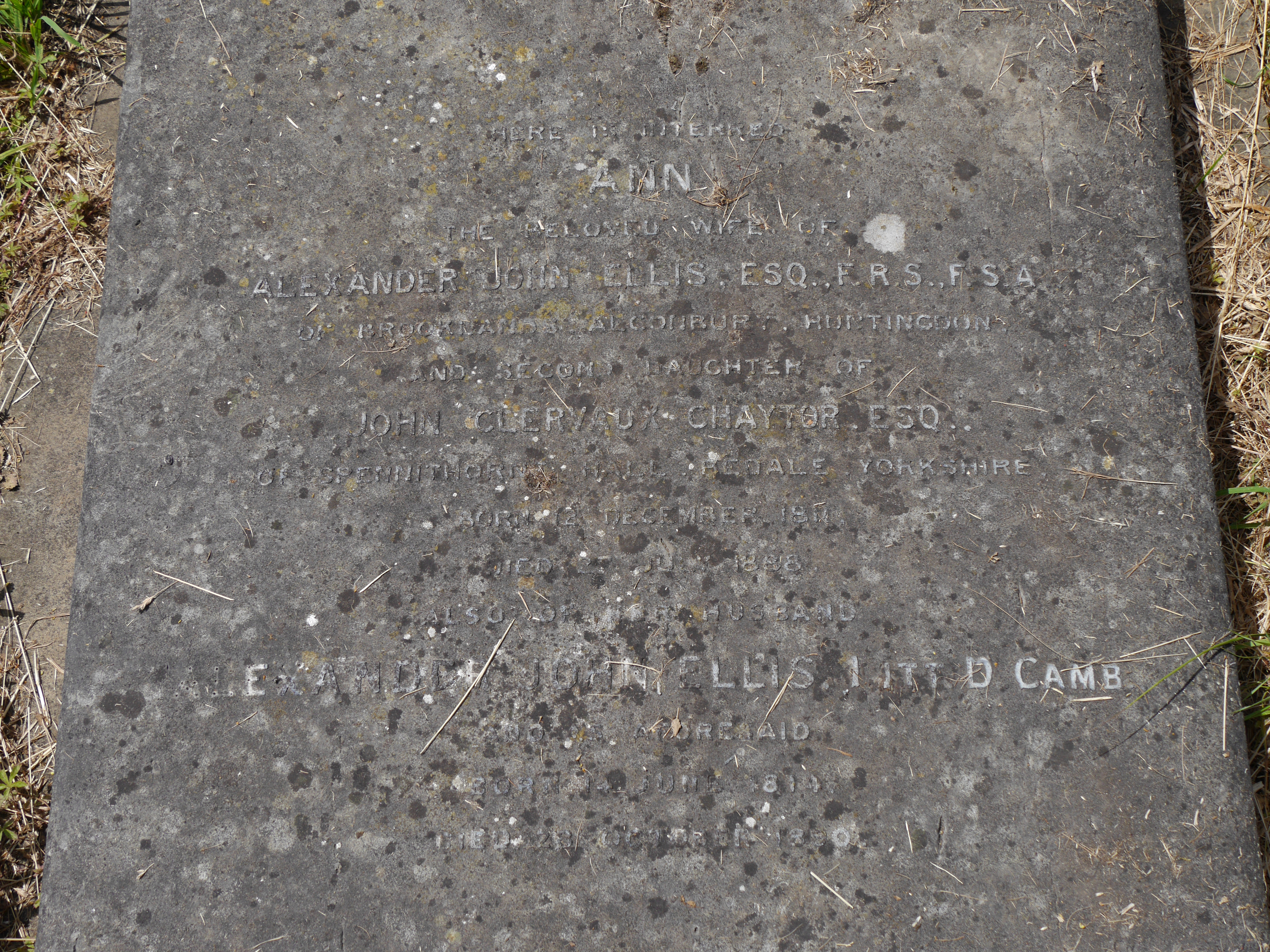
Monument detail, Kensal Green Cemetery

Ellis developed two phonetic alphabets, the English Phonotypic Alphabet (together with Isaac Pitman), which used many new letters, and the Palaeotype alphabet, which replaced many of these with turned letters (such as ⟨ə⟩, ⟨ɔ⟩), small caps (such as ⟨ɪ⟩), and italics. These letters, as well as two of his own creation, ⟨ʃ⟩ and ⟨ʒ⟩, were passed on to Henry Sweet's Romic alphabet and from there to the International Phonetic Alphabet.

== Selected publications ==
- 1845, The Alphabet of Nature
- 1848, A Plea for Phonetic Spelling: or, The Necessity of Orthographic Reform
- 1869, On Early English Pronunciation, London: N. Trübner / reissued by Greenwood Press: New York (1968).
- 1885, "On the Musical Scales of Various Nations"
- 1889, On early English pronunciation : with especial reference to Shakspere and Chaucer, containing an investigation of the correspondence of writing with speech in England from the Anglosaxon period to the present day ...
- 1890, English Dialects – Their Sounds and Homes
