= Dialect Test =

The Dialect Test was created by A.J. Ellis in February 1879, and was used in the fieldwork for his work On Early English Pronunciation. It stands as one of the earliest methods of identifying vowel sounds and features of speech. The aim was to capture the main vowel sounds of an individual dialect by listening to the reading of a short passage. All the categories of West Saxon words and vowels were included in the test so that comparisons could be made with the historic West Saxon speech as well as with various other dialects.

1. So I say, mates, you see now that I am right about that little girl coming from the school yonder.
2. She is going down the road there through the red gate on the left hand side of the way.
3. Sure enough, the child has gone straight up to the door of the wrong house,
4. where she will chance to find that drunken deaf shrivelled fellow of the name of Thomas.
5. We all know him very well.
6. Won't the old chap soon teach her not to do it again, poor thing!
7. Look! Isn't it true?

The test consists of seventy-six words, although some of the words are repeated. The pronunciation of each word or the substitution of another word [for example, many informants said "See!" rather than "Look!"] is noted during the test. In On Early English Pronunciation, A.J. Ellis distinguished forty-two different dialects in England and the Scottish Lowlands.

In A Grammar of the Dialect of Windhill, Joseph Wright said of Ellis' work, "If his rendering of the dialect test of other dialect speeches is as inaccurate as that of the Windhill dialect, the value of these tests for phonetic and philological purposes is not very great." Peter Anderson argued that the small differences between Wright's and Ellis's descriptions of the Windhill dialect were likely to be matters of "transcriptional style", as also occurred between different fieldworkers in the Survey of English Dialects.

The test was used to illustrate different dialects in a series of gramophone records produced by the British Drama League in the early 20th century.
