= Palaeotype alphabet =

Phonetic alphabet

Palaeotype Paleotype
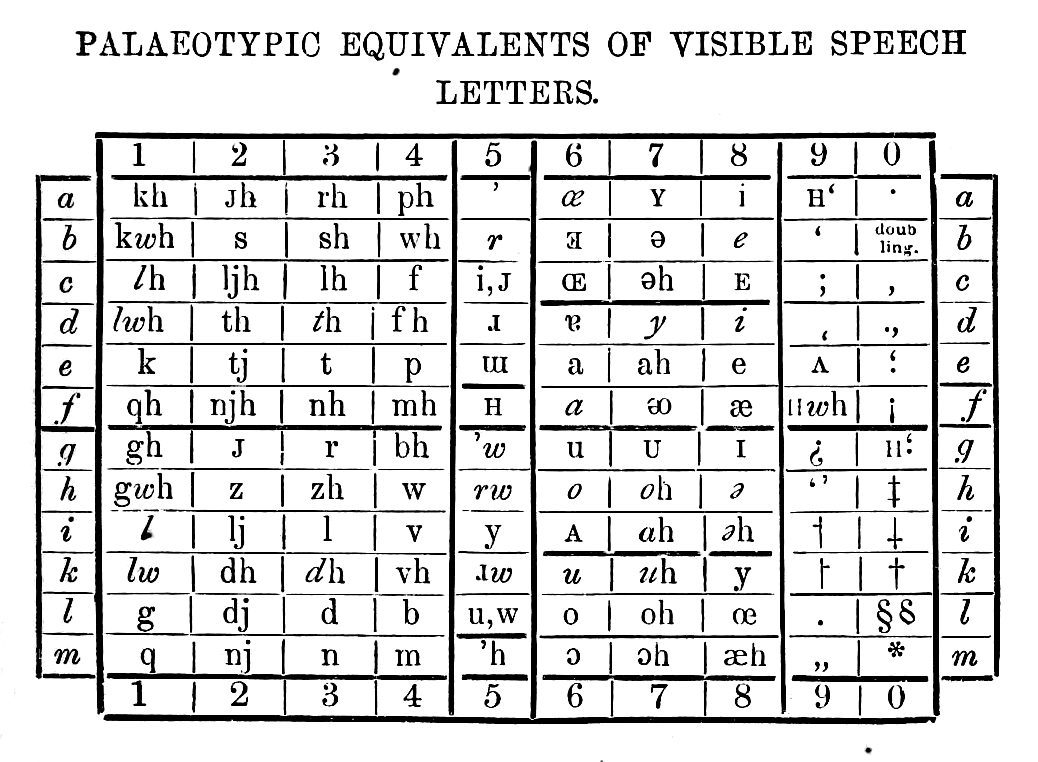
- Letters of the palaeotype alphabet, organized per the chart for Visible Speech, as published in 1869
- Script type: alphabet (phonetic)
- Creator: Alexander John Ellis
- Language: English

Related scripts
- Parent systems: Latin alphabet: Lepsius Standard Alphabet; Palaeotype
- Child systems: Romic alphabet

The Palaeotype alphabet is a phonetic alphabet used by Alexander John Ellis to describe the pronunciation of English. It was based on the theory of Bell's Visible Speech, but set in roman script, and attempted to include the sounds conveyed by Lepsius's Standard Alphabet as well. It in turn inspired Henry Sweet's 1877 Romic alphabet, which itself served as the basis for the International Phonetic Alphabet.

It differs from previous phonetic alphabets, especially the English Phonotypic Alphabet of the same author, by maximal use of trivial changes to existing characters, including rotated letters (such as ⟨ə⟩, ⟨ɔ⟩), small capitals (such as ⟨ɪ⟩), rotated small capitals, and italic rather than roman typeface (such as ⟨𝑙⟩).

== Letters ==
The alphabet and its diacritics were quite similar to early versions of Sweet's Romic alphabet.

All letters could be capitalized. In the case of small-capitals, capitalization was marked by a colon, so e.g. ⟨:R⟩ was a capital ⟨ʀ⟩. ⟨ɔ⟩ was a graphic substitution for small-capital o, so its capital was ⟨:O⟩. For some reason, turned-Q instead of turned-A was used as the capital of ⟨ɐ⟩.

(Parentheses) were used to set off phonetic transcription from regular text.

=== Vowels ===
⟨i y e œ æ ə a a ɔ o u⟩ had basically the same values as in the IPA. Not all of the vowels seem to make sense when plotted on a modern chart, as below, either through jumbled graphic correspondence or according to the languages they were identified with, suggesting that the phonetic analysis was not sophisticated. For example, (a) is defined as unrounded (o), but (a) is identified as the 'a' of Italian matto and French chatte (that is, IPA [a]), whereas (o) is identified as the Italian 'open o' ("o aperto") and the 'o' of French homme (that is, IPA [ɔ]), and [a] is not unrounded [ɔ]. Nevertheless, all vowels are identified in their placement in the table through sets of definitions that lock in place each of nine tetrads (such as the four close front vowels i · ɪ · i · y).

Palaeotype vowels (paired vowels are unrounded and rounded)
	Front	Central	Back
Close	i · ɪ	ʏ · ᴜ	œ · u
Close	i · y	y · uh	ɐ · u
Mid	e · ə	ə · oh	ⱻ · 𝑜
Mid	e · œ	ah · oh	a · o
Open	ᴇ · əh	əh · ah	ɶ · ᴀ
Open	æ · æh	ᴔ · ɔh	a · ɔ

⟨ɐ⟩ was used for the English reduced schwa, as the 'a' in 'real' or the 'o' in 'mention', ⟨ə⟩ for the vowel of 'but'.

Long vowels were doubled, as ⟨aa⟩ for long (a). A comma was used for hiatus (diaeresis), as ⟨a,a⟩ for two (a)s in sequence. (.,) was used for "strong hiatus" (beginning the following abruptly), and (, ) for a soft/inaudible onset to a vowel.

A turned apostrophe, ⟨⸲⟩, essentially an ogonek, was used for nasal vowels, as in (a⸲) = IPA [ã], but ⟨ʌ⟩ for French nasal vowels (which phoneticists of this era described as having some sort of guttural quality), as in (aʌ) = IPA [ɑ̃]. A turned zero indicated a more-open articulation, (w) indicated rounding, and a minus sign removed an element of articulation. E.g., (a0) is a more-open (a), (aw) a rounded (a), (a−0) a less-open (a), and (o−w) an unrounded (o).

(’) was "simple voice", as in (tabl’) for French table, or (𝑜𝑜p·’n) for English 'open'. (’h) was "a scarcely audible (ə)", and (’j) a "faint sound of (ᴊ, i)" as at the off-glide of the English vowel in see. When doubled, (’’) was used for Sanskrit ॠ (’’ʀ) and theoretical ॡ (’’l). (‘), bending in the opposite direction, meant voiceless, as in (‘a) = IPA [ḁ].

=== Consonants ===
The letters ⟨h, j⟩ and italic ⟨𝑤⟩ were only used for digraphs, and had no sound value of their own. ⟨j⟩ and ⟨𝑤⟩ were equivalent to IPA ⟨ʲ, ʷ⟩, whereas the effect of ⟨h⟩ was unpredictable. The h could come after a j or 𝑤, as in s𝑤h (defined as sh*wh).

⟨ʜ, ᴊ, q⟩ were used for IPA [h, j, ŋ].

Palaeotype consonants (paired consonants are voiceless and voiced)
	Lab.	Lab-D.	Dent.	Alv.	Palv.	Retro.	Pal.	Velar	Uv.	Labv	Phar.	Glot.
Nasal	mh · m		.nh · .n	nh · n		ɴh · ɴ	qh · q	qh · q	ꞯh · ꞯ			
Plosive	p · b	ᴘ · ʙ	.t · .d	t · d		ᴛ · ᴅ	k · g	k · g	ᴋ · ɢ			; ؛
Fric.	ph · bh	f · v f · v	th · dh c · c	s · z	sh · zh	sh · zh	kh · gh	kh · gh x · x	ᴋh · ɢh		h · ↋	ʜ ·
Lateral			.lh · .l	lh · l		ʟh · ʟ	lh · l					
Trill	prh · brh			.rh · .r					𝑟h · 𝑟			
Other rhotics				rh · r		ʀh · ʀ				· ɯ		
Approx.							ᴊh · ᴊ			wh · w		
Click			ʔ		↊		∂		⸸			
Lateral click							¶					

English ch and j sounds were written ⟨tsh⟩ and ⟨dzh⟩. Czech ř is ⟨rzh, rsh⟩. (lh) is a voiceless (l), but apparently not a lateral fricative, as Ellis renders Welsh 'll' as (lhh).

⟨r⟩ was used for both the Spanish flap and English initial 'r'. ⟨ɹ⟩ and 'palatal' ⟨ɹ⟩ were used for English rhotic vowels, either as a coda if a distinct vowel could be heard, or alone for e.g. (sɹf) or (səɹf) 'surf' and (sɹf) or (səɹf) 'serf'.

A combining ⟨ʜ⟩ made the aspirates ⟨pʜ, tʜ, kʜ⟩ etc. (‘b, ‘d, ‘g), defined as (b*p) etc., are unvoiced unaspirated (p, t, k) -- specifically the Germanic consonants frequently written [b̥, d̥, ɡ̊] in IPA. After a consonant, ⟨‘⟩ seemed to have meant an aspirated release, e.g. English (b𝑖t‘) 'bit'.

Italic ⟨t, d, s, z, th, dh, n⟩ were used for the 'emphatic' sounds of Arabic and similar languages. As noted below, 𝑏, 𝑝 were also used. 𝑝 might have been Lepsius's notation for the Quechua ejective p', in which case 𝑏 would have no explicit meaning.

Voicing transitions were apparently indicated by combining voiced and voiceless consonants. E.g. (zs) for the final /z/ in English days, buzz, (sz) for German initial s.

⟨1⟩ (a turned digit 1) was used for the Semitic letter 'alif.

==== Modifications of consonants ====
Various symbols were used to modify consonants, such as ⟨j⟩ for palatalization and ⟨𝑤⟩ for labialization. ⟨*⟩ was used to indicate simultaneous articulation, what in the IPA would be a tie bar. For instance, (tj) could be defined as ⟨t*ᴊ⟩.

A period / full stop was used for forceful pronunciation. E.g., (.f) was a "violently hissed (f)", and (.gh) a "violently buzzed [= voiced] (gh)". In the case of ⟨.r⟩, it produced a trill. However, with other letters for alveolar consonants it was taken to mean 'advanced', with "the tip of the tongue on gums" (presumably dental, though that doesn't quite fit the second definition).

The right half of a dagger, ⟨⸷⟩ (that is, ⟨†⟩ with the left arm removed) indicated fronting (pronounced closer to the front of the mouth), and the left half, ⟨⸶⟩, retraction (pronounced closer to the throat). A dagger indicated protrusion, as in interdental (t†). A turned dagger indicated retroflection, so (t⸸) was the same as (ᴛ). A double dagger indicated a click, so a fronted (t‡) was the same as (5), and (t⸸‡) the same as (↊).

⟨§⟩ indicated bilateral airflow (off both sides of the tongue). Usually the bottom loop was filed off to indicate unilateral airflow.

⟨¿⟩ was combined with other letters to indicate they were trilled, ⟨¡⟩ that it was ingressive.

==== Dubious consonants ====
In several cases, Ellis carried over letters or at least the sounds that they described from Lepsius's alphabet without knowing what they were supposed to be. That was the case for (p), which he supposed might have been some sort of emphatic in Quechua, which indeed has an ejective p'. If that was the case, the voiced equivalent (b) that he invented had no real meaning. There are other cases in which his notation is dubious.

(grh) was defined as (gh¿), a velar trill, which is not possible, and identified with the Semitic letter 'ayin, which elsewhere was given the value (↋). The voiceless analog, (krh) = (kh¿), is identified with Swiss German 'ch' and Arabic 'kh' and so perhaps they were uvular (and duplicates of (ᴋh · ɢh)).or something between those values.

(fh, vh) are defined as (f*kh, v*gh), which do not occur in human languages. The former, however, parallels the IPA's definition of their letter ɧ.

(ɴh) was defined as the sound Lespius said occurred before Dravidian (ᴅh), rather than voiceless (ɴ) as one might expect. However, Ellis listed no sound (ᴅh). He listed (ᴅhh), which he defined as "Lepsius's Dravidian sound, nearly (ᴅ𝑧h)", and so perhaps he intended ?(ɴhh) here. There is also voiceless (ᴛhh) for "Lepsius's Dravidian sound, nearly (ᴛ𝑠h)".

(ʜ‘) is defined as a "jerked whisper" and (_{ᴛ}) a "lisped (l)" (with its voiceless partner ⟨⟩). The meanings of both are somewhat obscure.

(_{ʟ}) was described as a "glottal Low German trill, nearly (↋)". There is an epiglottal trill, which is indeed close to 'ayin, but it does not occur in Low German.

(ʜw, ʜwh) were "a voiced whistle" and "an ordinary whistle, distinct from (wh, kwh)". The meaning is unclear.

=== Stress, tone and prosody ===
⟨·⟩ before a word indicated prosodic or contrastive stress. After a syllable it indicated lexical stress.

⟨:⟩ after a syllable indicated secondary stress.

Tones were schematicized with periods and turned periods: (..) low tone, (··) high tone, (·.) falling tone, (.·) rising tone, (..·, ·..) -- the same, with longer time at low tone, (·.·) dipping tone, (.·.) peaking tone.

(؛ ,·؛.) were high and low checked tones.

Preceding a word, (·:·) and (.:.) meant to speak in high or low key.

(‘’) meant to speak the following in a "subdued" tone.

⟨**⟩ modified an utterance. If the asterisks came between two symbols, they meant to replace the first with the second. For example, ⟨l**lj⟩ before a phrase meant that all (l)s in that phrase were palatalized. Otherwise, the phonetic detail was to be applied to the entirety of the utterance. For example, ⟨**.’⟩ indicated that all the following was pronounced with a strained voice.

A hyphen indicated liaison, as in French (nuz- avoʌ) nous avons.

== Bibliography ==
- Alexander J. Ellis, On Early English pronunciation with especial reference to Shakspere and Chaucer, 5 volumes, Londres : The Philological Society, The Early English Text Society, et The Chaucer Society, 1869. (en ligne : volume 1, volume 2, volume 3, volume 4, volume 5)
- Michael Everson, Proposal to encode six punctuation characters in the UCS, December 5, 2009. (online)
