= General Alphabet of Cameroon Languages =

Orthographic system for Cameroonian languages

B with a left hook ⟨ɋ⟩, a letter unique to the General Alphabet. It is now apparently replaced by ⟨br⟩.

The General Alphabet of Cameroon Languages is a bicameral orthographic system created in the late 1970s for all Cameroonian languages. Consonant and vowel letters are not to contain diacritics, though ⟨ẅ⟩ is a temporary exception. The alphabet is not used sufficiently for the one unique letter, a bilabial trill ⟨ɋ⟩ to have been added to Unicode; in any case, that letter has now been replaced.

Maurice Tadadjeu and Etienne Sadembouo were central to this effort.

== Consonants ==
Uncommon consonants that do not make a phonemic contrast within a language with similar but more common consonants are not provided for. These include /ɸ/, /β/, /θ/, /ð/. However, the alphabet provides a stock of digraphs for unattested sounds that may be discovered among unwritten languages in the future.

Cameroonian consonants
| | | Bilabial | labio- dental | inter- dental | dental/ alveolar | pre- palatal | palatal | velar | labio- velar | glottal |
|---|---|---|---|---|---|---|---|---|---|---|
| Stop | voiceless | p | | | t | | | k | kp | ʼ [ʔ] |
| Stop | voiced | b | | | d | | | g | gb | |
| Implosive/glottalized | | ɓ | | | ɗ | | ƴ [ˀj] | | | |
| Affricate | voiceless | | pf | tf | ts | c [tʃ] | | | kf | |
| Affricate | voiced | | bv | dv | dz | j [dʒ] | | | gv | |
| Fricative | voiceless | | f | | s | sh [ʃ] | hy | x | xf | h |
| Fricative | voiced | | v | | z | zh [ʒ] | | gh [ɣ] | hv | |
| Nasal | | m | | | n | | ny [ɲ] | ŋ | ŋm | |
| Lateral | approximant | | lv | | l | | | | | |
| Lateral | voiceless fric. | | | | sl [ɬ] | | | | | |
| Lateral | voiced fric. | | | | zl [ɮ] | | | | | |
| Vibrant | | br [ʙ] | vb [ⱱ] | | r | | | | | |
| Glide | | ẅ [β̞] | | | | | y | | w | |

Aspirated consonants are written ph, th, kh etc. Palatalized and labialized consonants are py, ty, ky and pw, tw, kw etc. Retroflex consonants are written either Cr or with a cedilla: tr, sr or ţ, ş, etc. Prenasalized consonants are mb, nd, ŋg etc. Preglottalized consonants are ʼb, ʼd, ʼm etc. Geminant consonants are written double.

== Vowels ==
Vowels that appear phonetically in Cameroonian languages, but do not make phonemic distinctions, are not provided for. These include [ɪ], [ʊ], [y].

Cameroonian vowels
| | Front unrounded | front rounded | central unrounded | back unrounded | back rounded |
|---|---|---|---|---|---|
| High | i | | ɨ | ʉ [ɯ] | u |
| Mid-high | e | ø | | | o |
| Mid-low | ɛ | | ə | | ɔ |
| Low | | | a | α | |

The descriptions of ⟨ɨ⟩ and ⟨ʉ⟩ are inconsistent, with ⟨ɨ⟩ being either IPA [ɨ] or [ʉ]. The identifications above are how they are described with actual examples. Additional IPA vowels are available if needed.

Long vowels are written double. Nasal vowels are written with a cedilla: a̧ etc., rather than with a tilde to leave room for tone marking, or with a single following nasal consonant: aŋ etc. (presumably assimilating to any following consonant), in which case [VN] would be written with a double nasal: aŋŋ etc. Harmonic vowels are written with a sub-dot, as ⟨bibị⟩ for [bib-y].

== Tones ==
Tone is written as in the IPA, with the addition of a vertical mark for mid-low tone: ⟨á ā a̍ à, â ǎ⟩ etc. (the opposite of the value of the vertical mark elsewhere). Where rising and falling tones only occur on long vowels, they are decomposed: ⟨áà, àá⟩ etc. The high tone mark is used for contrastive stress in languages that do not have tone.

== See also ==
- Pan-Nigerian alphabet
- Africa Alphabet
- African Reference Alphabet
