= Theta =

Eighth letter of the Greek alphabet

Theta (Note: UK: /θiːtə/ THEE-tə, US: /θeɪtə/ THAY-tə; Ancient Greek: θῆτα, romanized: thē̂ta, pronounced [tʰɛ̂ːta]; Modern Greek: θήτα, romanized: thī́ta, pronounced [θita]) (uppercase Θ or ϴ; lowercase θ; cursive ϑ) is the eighth letter of the Greek alphabet, derived from the Phoenician letter Teth 𐤈. In the system of Greek numerals, it has a value of 9.

== Greek ==
In Ancient Greek, θ originally represented the aspirated voiceless dental plosive, IPA: [t̪ʰ], but it later became a voiceless dental fricative, IPA: [θ], which is the value it retains in Modern Greek.

== Forms ==
Modern print theta, in a typical uppercase and two different lowercase glyph forms.

In its archaic form, θ was written as a cross within a circle (as in the Etruscan or), and later, as a line or point in circle ( or).

In modern print, lowercase theta may appear in two different forms: one resembling the uppercase form, like a zero with a horizontal bar through it, and one more cursive style featuring an open loop, resembling a nine. For use as a mathematical symbol, where the difference between the two forms may be significant, a dedicated Unicode symbol U+03D1 ϑ GREEK THETA SYMBOL was introduced, which always displays the open-loop form. There is also U+03F4 ϴ GREEK CAPITAL THETA SYMBOL, which differs from most realizations of the normal textual uppercase letter by having a cross-bar that goes all the way across, touching the outer O-shape on both sides.

== Latin ==
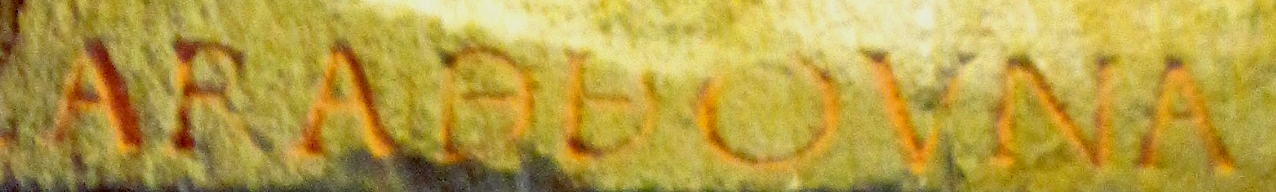
The name ARAÐÐOVNA on a Gaulish tombstone

In the Latin script used for the Gaulish language, theta inspired the tau gallicum (Ꟈ ꟈ). The phonetic value of the tau gallicum is thought to have been [t͡s]. In addition, multiple modern languages written in Latin script use Latin theta.

== Cyrillic ==
The early Cyrillic letter fita (Ѳ, ѳ) developed from θ. This letter existed in the Russian alphabet until the 1918 Russian orthography reform.

== International Phonetic Alphabet ==
In the International Phonetic Alphabet (IPA), [θ] represents the voiceless dental fricative, as in thigh (/θaɪ/), thick (/θɪk/), enthuse (/ˈɛnθjuːz/), thing (/θɪŋ/), think (/θɪŋk/), thin (/θɪn/), thang (/θæŋ/), myth (/mɪθ/), smith (/smɪθ/), youth (/juːθ/), bath (/bæθ/), math (/mæθ/), birth (/bɜːrθ/), fourth (/fɔːrθ/), death (/dɛθ/), or health (/hɛlθ/). It does not represent the consonant in the, which is the voiced dental fricative counterpart, represented in the IPA by [ð] (cf. Eth). A similar-looking lower-case symbol, [ɵ], which is called barred o, is the IPA symbol for the close-mid central rounded vowel.

== Mathematics and science ==
=== Lower case ===
The lowercase letter θ is used as a symbol for:

- A plane angle in geometry
- Angle (bold) and angular separation in physics
- An unknown angular variable in trigonometry
- A special function ϑ(z; τ) of several complex variables θ.
- The first Chebyshev function θ(x) in prime number theory
- The potential temperature in meteorology
- Dimensionless temperature in heat transport phenomena
- The score of a test taker in item response theory
- Theta Type Replication: a type of bacterial DNA replication specific to circular chromosomes
- Threshold value of an artificial neuron
- A Bayer designation letter applied to a star in a constellation; usually the eighth star so labelled but not necessarily the eighth-brightest as viewed from Earth
- The statistical parameter frequently used in writing the likelihood function
- The Watterson estimator θ̂_{w} for the population mutation rate in population genetics
- Indicates a minimum optimum integration level determined by the intersection of GG and LL schedules (The GG-LL schedules are tools used in analyzing the potential benefits of a country pegging their domestic currency to a foreign currency.)
- The reserve ratio of banks in economic models
- The ordinal collapsing function developed by Solomon Feferman
- The Heaviside step function
- In pharmacology, the fraction of ligand bound to a macromolecule based on the Hill Equation
- The angle of the incident beam during X-ray diffraction

=== Upper case ===
The uppercase letter Θ is used as a symbol for:

- Theta functions
- Dimension of temperature, by SI standard (in italics)
- An asymptotically tight bound in the analysis of algorithms (big O notation)
- A certain ordinal number in set theory
- Pentaquarks, exotic baryons in particle physics
- A brain signal frequency (beta, alpha, theta, delta) ranging from 4–8 Hz
- One of the variables known as "Greeks" in finance, representing time decay of options or the change in the intrinsic value of an option divided by the number of days until the option expires
- The complexity class Θ_{2}^{P}, also known as P^{NP[log]}, representing the class of decision problems that can be solved in polynomial time when allowing logarithmically many queries to an NP oracle

== Symbolism ==
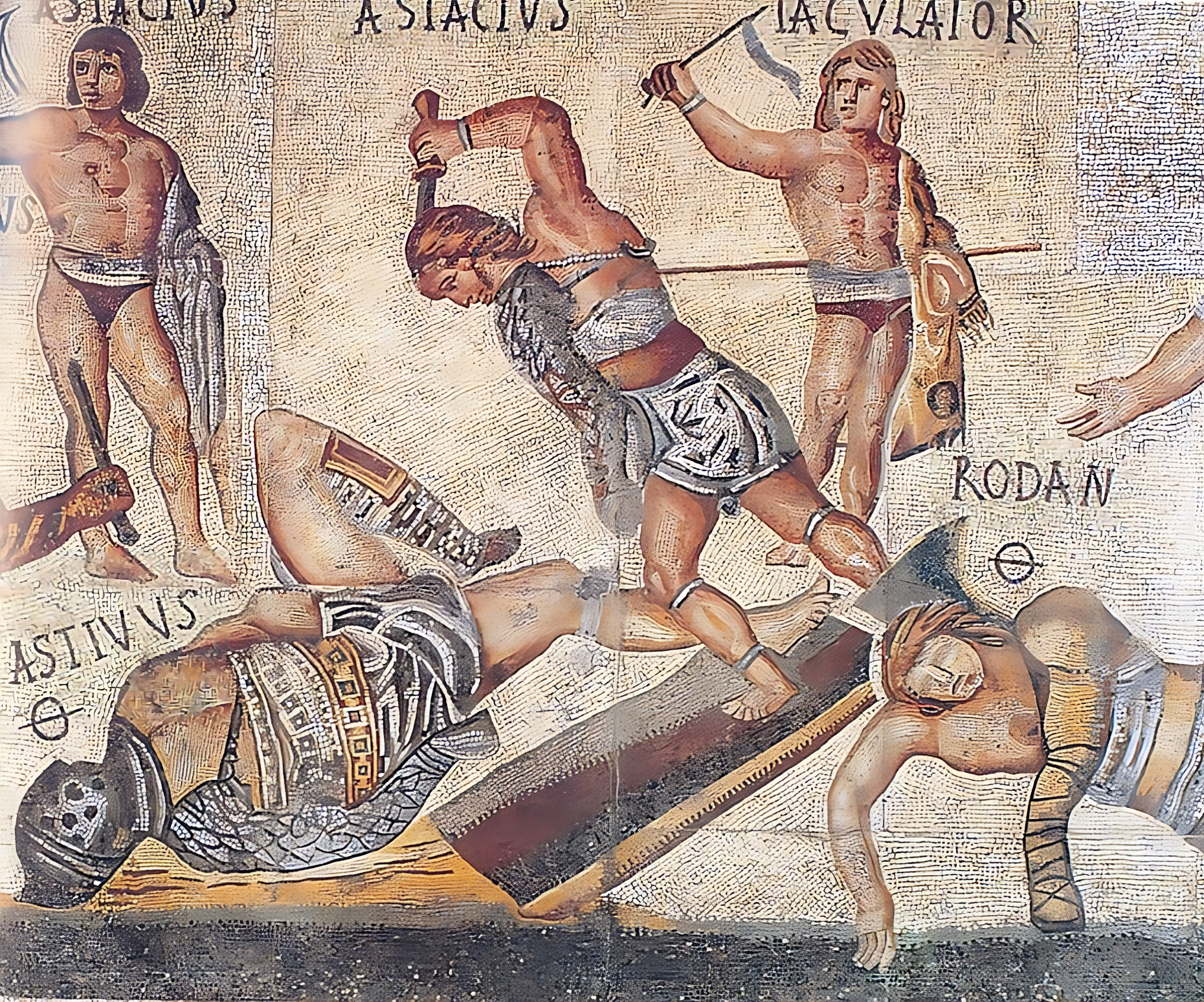
θ (θάνατος, death) in a mosaic

In ancient times, Tau was used as a symbol for life or resurrection, whereas the eighth letter of the Greek alphabet (ninth in the archaic form anciently used for numeration), theta, was considered the symbol of death. A quotation attributed to the ancient Roman author Ennius (though possibly spuriously) said of it: "oh, theta, a letter much unluckier than the others".

According to Porphyry of Tyros, the Egyptians used an X within a circle as a symbol of the soul; having a value of nine, it was used as a symbol for Ennead. Johannes Lydus says that the Egyptians used a symbol for Kosmos in the form of theta, with a fiery circle representing the world, and a snake spanning the middle representing Agathos Daimon (literally: good spirit).

=== Abbreviation ===
In classical Athens, it was used as an abbreviation for the Greek θάνατος (Thanatos, "death") and as it vaguely resembles a human skull, theta was used as a warning symbol of death, in the same way that skull and crossbones are used in modern times. It survives on potsherds used by Athenians when voting for the death penalty. Petrus de Dacia in a document from 1291 relates the idea that theta was used to brand criminals as empty ciphers, and the branding rod was affixed to the crossbar spanning the circle. For this reason, the use of the number 9 was sometimes avoided where the connotation was felt to be unlucky—the mint marks of some Late Imperial Roman coins famously have the sum ΔΕ or ΕΔ (delta and epsilon, that is 4 and 5) substituted as a euphemism where a Θ (9) would otherwise be expected.

== Unicode ==
- U+0398 Θ GREEK CAPITAL LETTER THETA (&Theta;)
- U+03B8 θ GREEK SMALL LETTER THETA (&theta;)
- U+03D1 ϑ GREEK THETA SYMBOL (&thetasym;, &thetav;, &vartheta;)
- U+03F4 ϴ GREEK CAPITAL THETA SYMBOL
- U+0472 Ѳ CYRILLIC CAPITAL LETTER FITA
- U+0473 ѳ CYRILLIC SMALL LETTER FITA
- U+1DBF ᶿ MODIFIER LETTER SMALL THETA
- U+2C2A Ⱚ GLAGOLITIC CAPITAL LETTER FITA
- U+2C5A ⱚ GLAGOLITIC SMALL LETTER FITA
- U+2C90 Ⲑ COPTIC CAPITAL LETTER THETHE
- U+2C91 ⲑ COPTIC SMALL LETTER THETHE
- U+2DF4 ◌ⷴ COMBINING CYRILLIC LETTER FITA
- U+1CF83 𜾃 ZNAMENNY NEUME FITA
- U+1D6AF 𝚯 MATHEMATICAL BOLD CAPITAL THETA (Note: The mathematical characters are used only in math. Stylized Greek text should be encoded using normal Greek letters, with markup and formatting to indicate text style.)
- U+1D6B9 𝚹 MATHEMATICAL BOLD CAPITAL THETA SYMBOL
- U+1D6C9 𝛉 MATHEMATICAL BOLD SMALL THETA
- U+1D6DD 𝛝 MATHEMATICAL BOLD THETA SYMBOL
- U+1D6E9 𝛩 MATHEMATICAL ITALIC CAPITAL THETA
- U+1D6F3 𝛳 MATHEMATICAL ITALIC CAPITAL THETA SYMBOL
- U+1D703 𝜃 MATHEMATICAL ITALIC SMALL THETA
- U+1D717 𝜗 MATHEMATICAL ITALIC THETA SYMBOL
- U+1D723 𝜣 MATHEMATICAL BOLD ITALIC CAPITAL THETA
- U+1D72D 𝜭 MATHEMATICAL BOLD ITALIC CAPITAL THETA SYMBOL
- U+1D73D 𝜽 MATHEMATICAL BOLD ITALIC SMALL THETA
- U+1D751 𝝑 MATHEMATICAL BOLD ITALIC THETA SYMBOL
- U+1D75D 𝝝 MATHEMATICAL SANS-SERIF BOLD CAPITAL THETA
- U+1D767 𝝧 MATHEMATICAL SANS-SERIF BOLD CAPITAL THETA SYMBOL
- U+1D777 𝝷 MATHEMATICAL SANS-SERIF BOLD SMALL THETA
- U+1D78B 𝞋 MATHEMATICAL SANS-SERIF BOLD THETA SYMBOL
- U+1D797 𝞗 MATHEMATICAL SANS-SERIF BOLD ITALIC CAPITAL THETA
- U+1D7A1 𝞡 MATHEMATICAL SANS-SERIF BOLD ITALIC CAPITAL THETA SYMBOL
- U+1D7B1 𝞱 MATHEMATICAL SANS-SERIF BOLD ITALIC SMALL THETA
- U+1D7C5 𝟅 MATHEMATICAL SANS-SERIF BOLD ITALIC THETA SYMBOL
- U+1E02A ◌𞀪 COMBINING GLAGOLITIC LETTER FITA

== See also ==
- ʘ – Consonantal sound
