= Tau gallicum =

Letter of the Latin alphabet

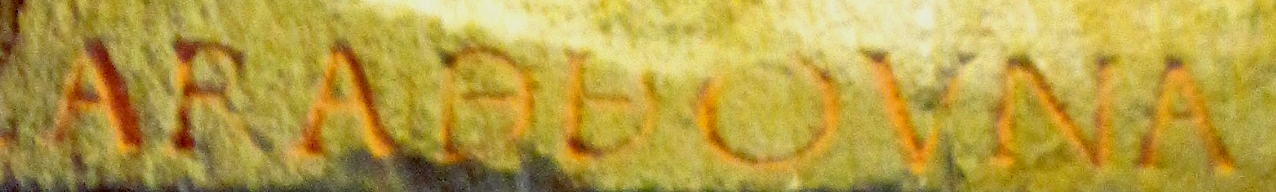
The name ARAꟇꟇOVNA on a Gallic tomb.

Tau gallicum (majuscule: Ꟈ, minuscule: ꟈ) is a letter that was used by the Gauls in their language. It is a D with the horizontal bar from the Greek letter theta (Θ). It likely represented a /t͡s/ or /st/ sound, like the ts in cats or the st in stop, though gemination is seldom present, such as in the Chamalières tablet.

== Name ==
The Latin phrase tau gallicum means "Gallic tau", referring to the nineteenth letter of the Greek alphabet. The only known mention of the letter is found in Catalepton, a set of epigrams attributed to Virgil and collected after his death in Appendix Vergiliana. The second epigram contains the following text:

Corinthiorum amator iste uerborum,
iste iste rhetor, namque quatenus totus
Thucydides, tyrannus Atticae febris:
tau Gallicum, min et sphin ut male illisit,
ita omnia ista uerba miscuit fratri.

— Virgil, Catalepton II

It is not known, however, whether the sound described by Virgil is the same as that for which the term is currently used.

== Letter ==
After using the Greek alphabet, the Gauls transcribed their language using the Latin alphabet. However, to note a sound unknown to it, they introduced the additional letter tau gallicum, said to have been inspired by the Greek letter Θ (theta). Its spelling varies between ⟨Ꟈ⟩ and ⟨ꟉꟉ⟩.

The letter can be found in the initial of the name of the Celtic goddess Sirona, whose name is written as: Sirona, Ꟈirona or Thirona, highlighting the difficulty of noting the initial sound in the Latin alphabet.

The letter is also present in the lead of Chamalières, a lead tablet discovered in 1971 in Chamalières and written in Gaulish with Latin cursive letters: snIeꟈꟈdic, aꟈꟈedillI.

== Pronunciation ==
The precise value of the sound transcribed by the Gallic tau is not known. It is supposed that it denotes an alveolar affricate /t͡s/, in free variation with [st] in initial position.

== Use on computers ==
The letter is encoded into Unicode as U+A7C7 Ꟈ LATIN CAPITAL LETTER D WITH SHORT STROKE OVERLAY and U+A7C8 ꟈ LATIN SMALL LETTER D WITH SHORT STROKE OVERLAY respectively.

Character information
Preview	Ꟈ		ꟈ	
Unicode name	LATIN CAPITAL LETTER D WITH SHORT STROKE OVERLAY		LATIN SMALL LETTER D WITH SHORT STROKE OVERLAY	
Encodings	decimal	hex	dec	hex
Unicode	42951	U+A7C7	42952	U+A7C8
UTF-8	234 159 135	EA 9F 87	234 159 136	EA 9F 88
Numeric character reference	&#42951;	&#xA7C7;	&#42952;	&#xA7C8;
