= Lepsius Standard Alphabet =

Latin-script transcription alphabet

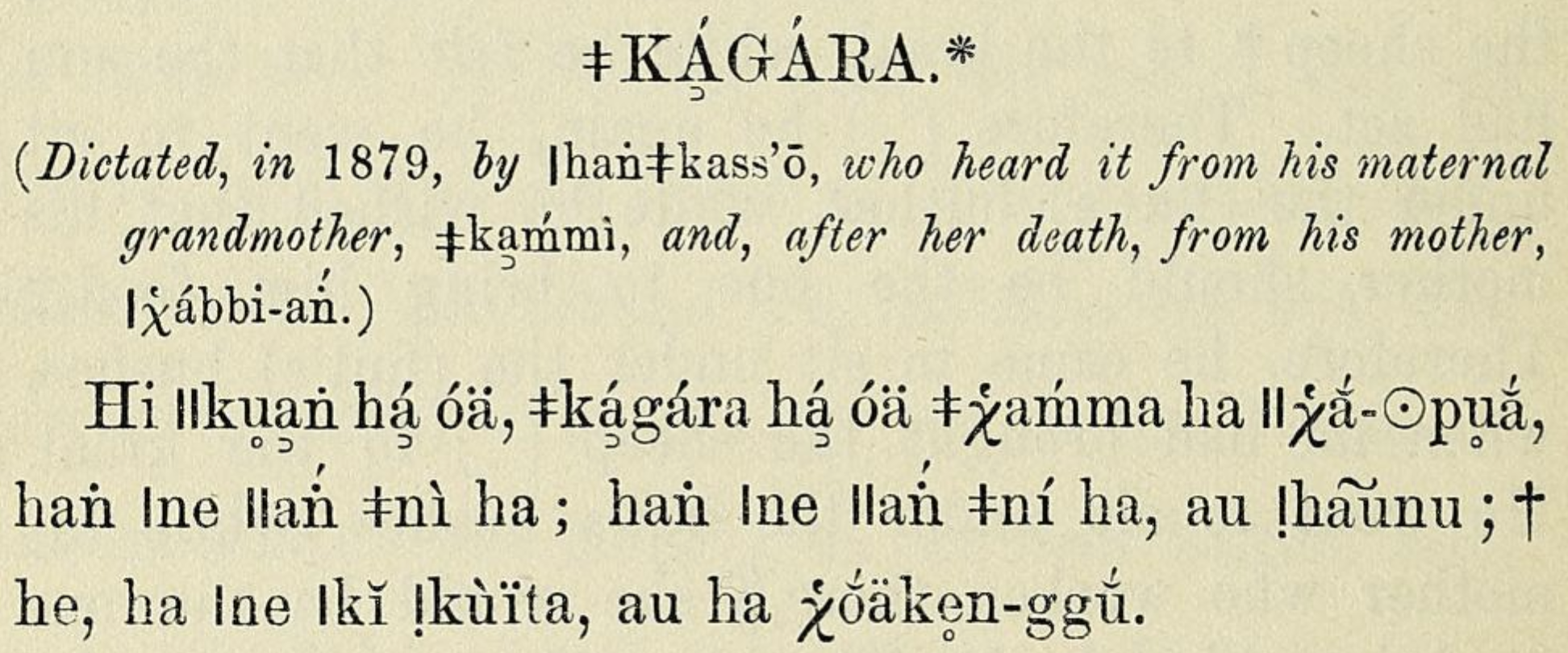
- First line of ǂKá̦gára in ǀXam language in W.H.I. Bleek and L. Lloyd, Specimens of Bushman folklore, 1911
- Script type: alphabet
- Creator: Karl Richard Lepsius
- Published: 1849
- Period: late 19th century
- Languages: Egyptian language, languages of Africa

Related scripts
- Parent systems: Egyptian hieroglyphics: Proto-Sinaitic; Phoenician; Greek; Latin; Lepsius Standard Alphabet
- Child systems: Paleotype

The Lepsius Standard Alphabet is a Latin-script alphabet developed by Karl Richard Lepsius. Lepsius initially used it to transcribe Egyptian hieroglyphs in his Denkmäler aus Ägypten und Äthiopien, and extended it to write African languages, published in 1853, 1854 and 1855, and in a revised edition in 1863. The alphabet was comprehensive but was not used much as it contained many diacritic marks and was difficult to read and typeset at that time. It was, however, influential in later projects such as Ellis's Paleotype, and diacritics such as the acute accent for palatalization, under-dot for retroflex, underline for Arabic emphatics, and his click letters continue in modern use.

== Vowels ==
Vowel length is indicated by a macron (ā) or a breve (ă) for long and short vowels, respectively. Open vowels are marked by a line under the letter (e̱), while a dot below the letter makes it a close vowel (ẹ). Rounded front vowels are written with an umlaut (ö [ø] and ü [y]), generally above, but below when the space above the letter is needed for vowel length marks (thus ṳ̄ or ṳ̆). Unrounded back vowels are indicated by a 'hook' (ogonek) on ę or į. Central vowels may be written as one of these series, or as reduced vowels.

As in the International Phonetic Alphabet, nasal vowels get a tilde (ã).

A small circle below a letter is used to mark both the schwa (e̥, also ḁ, i̥, u̥ etc. for other reduced vowels) and syllabic consonants (r̥ or l̥, for instance).

Diphthongs do not receive any special marking, they are simply juxtaposed (ai [ai̯]). A short sign can be used to distinguish which element of the diphthong is the on- or off-glide (uĭ, ŭi). Vowels in hiatus can be indicated with a diaeresis when necessary (aï [a.i]).

Other vowels are a with a subscript e for [æ]; a with a subscript o for [ɒ], and o̩ for [ʌ] or maybe [ɐ]. The English syllabic [ɝ] is ṙ̥.

Word stress is marked with an acute accent on a long vowel (á) and with a grave accent on a short vowel (à).

Klemp (p. 56*–58*) interprets the values of Lepsius's vowels as follows:

a [a ~ ɑ]
ą [æ] o̗ [ʌ] ḁ [ɒ]
e̠ [ɛ] o̤̠ [œ] o̠ [ɔ]
e [e̞] ę [ɜ] o̤ [ø̞] o [o̞]
ẹ [e] o̤̣ [ø] ọ [o]
i [i] į [ɨ ~ ɯ] ṳ [y] u [u]

== Consonants ==
The Lepsius letters without predictable diacritics are as follows:

LSA	IPA	Name
ʼ	[ʔ]	glottal stop
ꜣ	[ʕ]	voiced pharyngeal fricative
h	[h]	voiceless glottal fricative
h̔	[ħ]	voiceless pharyngeal fricative
q	[q]	voiceless uvular plosive
k	[k]	voiceless velar plosive
g	[ɡ]	voiced velar plosive
ṅ	[ŋ]	velar nasal
n̈	[ŋʷ]	labialized velar nasal
χ	[x]	voiceless velar fricative
γ	[ɣ]	voiced velar fricative
ṙ	[ʀ]	uvular trill
š	[ʃ]	voiceless postalveolar fricative
č	same as tš	
c̀	same as tš́	
ž	[ʒ]	voiced postalveolar fricative
ǰ	same as dž	
j̀	same as dž́	
y, j (Note: Lepsius used j for Slavic languages, y for most others.)	[j]	palatal approximant
t	[t]	voiceless alveolar plosive
ț	same as ts	
d	[d]	voiced alveolar plosive
d̦	same as dz	
n	[n]	alveolar nasal
s	[s]	voiceless alveolar fricative
z	[z]	voiced alveolar fricative
θ	[θ]	voiceless dental fricative
δ	[ð]	voiced dental fricative
r	[r]	alveolar trill
l	[l]	alveolar lateral approximant
ł	[ɫ]	voiced velarized alveolar approximant
p	[p]	voiceless bilabial plosive
b	[b]	voiced bilabial plosive
m	[m]	bilabial nasal
f	[f]	voiceless bilabial fricative
v	[v]	voiced bilabial fricative
w	[w]	labial-velar approximant
ı (Note: The four click letters are based on a vertical pipe without ascender or descender (that is, the height of the letter n). In some fonts, such as that used for Krönlein's Khoekhoe grammar, they have the height of the letter t.)	[ǀ]	dental click
ıı	[ǁ]	lateral click

Other consonant sounds may be derived from these. For example, palatal (and palatalized) consonants are marked with an acute accent: ḱ [c], ǵ [ɟ], ń [ɲ], χ́ [ç], š́ [ɕ], γ́ [ʝ], ž́ [ʑ], ĺ [ʎ], ‘ĺ [ʎ̝̊], ı́ [ǂ]. These can also be written with an appended y.

Labialized velars are written with an overdot: ġ [ɡʷ], γ̇ [ɣʷ], etc. (A dot on a non-velar letter, as in ṅ and ṙ in the table above, indicates a guttural articulation.)

Retroflex consonants are marked with an underdot: ṭ [ʈ], ḍ [ɖ], ṇ [ɳ], ṣ̌ [ʂ], ẓ̌ [ʐ], ṛ [ɽ], ḷ [ɭ], and ı̣ [ǃ].

The Semitic "emphatic" consonants are marked with an underline: ṯ [tˤ], ḏ [dˤ], s̱ [sˤ], ẕ [zˤ], δ̱ [ðˤ], ḻ [lˤ].

Aspiration is typically marked by h: kh [kʰ], but a turned apostrophe (Greek spiritus asper) is also used: k̒ [kʰ], ģ [ɡʱ]. Either convention may be used for voiceless sonorants: m̒ [m̥], ‘l [ɬ]. (Note: With the apostrophe placed before the l, presumably to avoid stacking it too high to print)

Affricates are generally written as sequences, e.g. tš for [t͡ʃ]. But the single letters č [t͡ʃ], ǰ [d͡ʒ], c̀ [t͡ɕ], j̀ [d͡ʑ], ț [t͡s], and d̦ [d͡z] are also used.

Implosives are written with a macron: b̄ [ɓ], d̄ [ɗ], j̄ [ʄ], ḡ [ɠ]. As with vowels, long (geminate) consonants may also be written with a macron, so this transcription can be ambiguous.

Lepsius typically characterized ejective consonants as tenuis, as they are completely unaspirated, and wrote them with the Greek spiritus lenis (p’, t’, etc.), which may be the source of the modern convention for ejectives in the IPA. However, when his sources made it clear that there was some activity in the throat, he transcribed them as emphatics.

When transcribing consonant letters which are pronounced the same but are etymologically distinct, as in Armenian, diacritics from the original alphabet or roman transliteration may be carried over. Similarly, unique sounds such as Czech ř may be carried over into Lepsius transcription. Lepsius used a diacritic r under t᷊ and d᷊ for some poorly-described sounds in Dravidian languages.

Standard capitalization is used. For example, when written in all caps, γ becomes Γ (as in AFΓAN "Afghan").

== Tones ==
Tones are marked with acute accents and grave accents (backticks) to the right and near the top or the bottom of the corresponding vowel. The diacritic may be underlined for a lower pitch, distinguishing eight possible tones in all.

Tone is not written directly, but rather needs to be established separately for each language. For example, the acute accent may indicate a high tone, a rising tone, or, in the case of Chinese, any tone called "rising" (上) for historical reasons.

S.A.	Level value	Contour value
ma´ (Note: In Lepsius's publications, this looks like a vertical bar ⟨ˈ⟩. However, it is repeatedly called "acute" in the text.)	[má]	[mǎ]
ma	[mā]	
ma`	[mà]	[mâ]

Low rising and falling tones can be distinguished from high rising and falling tones by underlining the accent mark: ⟨ma´̠, ma`̠⟩. The underline also transcribes the Chinese yin tones, under the mistaken impression that these tones are actually lower. Two additional tone marks, without any defined phonetic value, are used for Chinese: "level" maˏ (平) and checked maˎ (入); these may also be underlined.

== See also ==
- Africa Alphabet
- African Reference Alphabet
- Dinka alphabet
- ISO 6438
- Pan-Nigerian alphabet

== Bibliography ==
- Faulmann, Carl (1880), Das Buch der Schrift enthaltend die Schriftzeichen und Alphabete aller Zeiten und aller Völker des Erdkreises (in German) (2nd rev. ed.), Vienna: Kaiserlich-königliche Hof- und Staatsdruckerei – via Internet Archive
- Köhler, Oswin; Ladefoged, Peter; Snyman, Jan; Traill, Anthony; Vossen, Rainer (December 1988). "The Symbols for Clicks". Journal of the International Phonetic Association. 18 (2): 140–142. doi:10.1017/S0025100300003741. JSTOR 44526011.
- Lepsius, C. R. (1849), Denkmäler aus Ägypten un Äthiopien (in German), Berlin: Nicolaische Buchhandlung – via Münchener Digitalisierungszentrum (MDZ)
- Lepsius, C. R. (1854), Das allgemeine linguistische Alphabet: Grundsätze der Übertragung fremder Schriftsysteme und bisher noch ungeschriebener Sprachen in europäische Buchstaben (in German), Berlin: Verlag von Wilhelm Hertz – via Google Books
- Lepsius, C. R. (1855), Das allgemeine linguistische Alphabet: Grundsätze der Übertragung fremder Schriftsysteme und bisher noch ungeschriebener Sprachen in europäische Buchstaben (in German), Berlin: Verlag von Wilhelm Hertz – via Internet Archive
- Lepsius, C. R. (1863), Standard Alphabet for Reducing Unwritten Languages and Foreign Graphic Systems to a Uniform Orthography in European Letters (2nd rev. ed.), London: Williams & Norgate, archived from the original on 2009-06-18 – via Google Books
- Lepsius, C. R. (1981) [1863], Kemp, J. Alan (ed.), Standard Alphabet for Reducing Unwritten Languages and Foreign Graphic Systems to a Uniform Orthography in European Letters (2nd rev. ed.), Amsterdam: John Benjamins Publishing – via Google Books
