= Henry Sweet =

English linguist (1845–1912)

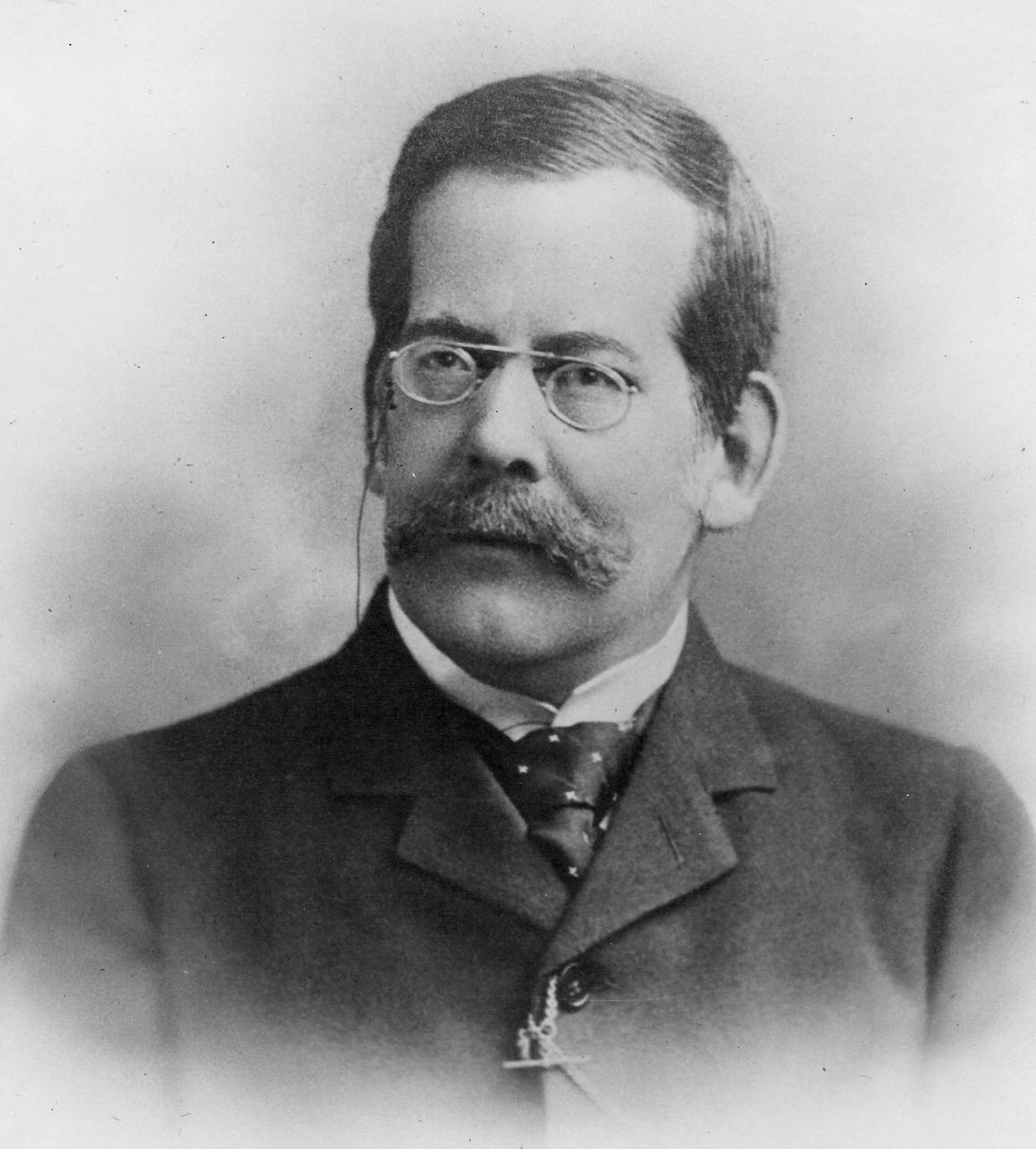
- Born: 15 September 1845; London
- Died: 30 April 1912 (aged 66); Oxford
- Education: Balliol College
- Scientific career
- Fields: Phonetics, Old English, language teaching
- Workplaces: Early English Text Society, Philological Society, Oxford University

Henry Sweet (15 September 1845 – 30 April 1912) was an English philologist, phonetician and grammarian.

As a philologist, he specialized in the Germanic languages, particularly Old English and Old Norse. In addition, Sweet published works on larger issues of phonetics and grammar in language and the teaching of languages. Many of his ideas have remained influential, and a number of his works continue to be in print, being used as course texts at colleges and universities.

== Life and work ==
Henry Sweet was born in St Pancras, London. He was educated at Bruce Castle School and King's College School, London. In 1864, he spent a short time studying at Heidelberg University. Upon his return to England, he took up an office job with a trading company in London. Five years later, aged twenty-four, he won a scholarship in German and entered Balliol College in Oxford.

Sweet neglected his formal academic coursework, concentrating instead on pursuing excellence in his private studies. Early recognition came in his first year at Oxford, when the prestigious Philological Society (of which he was later to become president) published a paper of his on Old English. In 1871, still an undergraduate, he edited King Alfred's translation of the Cura Pastoralis for the Early English Text Society (King Alfred's West-Saxon Version of Gregory's Pastoral Care: With an English Translation, the Latin Text, Notes, and an Introduction), his commentary establishing the foundation for Old English dialectology. He graduated in 1873, nearly thirty years old, with a fourth-class degree in literae humaniores. Subsequent works on Old English included An Anglo-Saxon Reader (1876), The Oldest English Texts (1885) and A Student's Dictionary of Anglo-Saxon (1896).

Sweet, like his contemporary Walter Skeat, felt under particular pressure from German scholars in English studies who, often state-employed, tenured, and accompanied by their comitatus of eager graduate students, "annexed" the historical study of English. Dismayed by the "swarms of young program-mongers turned out every year by German universities," he felt that "no English dilettante can hope to compete with them—except by Germanizing himself and losing all his nationality."

In 1877, Sweet published A Handbook of Phonetics, which attracted international attention among scholars and teachers of English in Europe. He followed up with the Elementarbuch des gesprochenen Englisch (1885), which was subsequently adapted as A Primer of Spoken English (1890). This included the first scientific description of educated London speech, later known as received pronunciation, with specimens of connected speech represented in phonetic script. In addition, he developed a version of shorthand called Current Shorthand, which had both orthographic and phonetic modes. His emphasis on spoken language and phonetics made him a pioneer in language teaching, a subject which he covered in detail in The Practical Study of Languages (1899). In 1901, Sweet was made reader in phonetics at Oxford. The Sounds of English (1908) was his last book on English pronunciation.

Other books by Sweet include An Icelandic Primer with Grammar, Notes and Glossary (1886), The History of Language (1900), and a number of other works he edited for the Early English Text Society. Sweet was also closely involved in the early history of the Oxford English Dictionary.

Despite the recognition he received for his scholarly work, Sweet never received a university professorship, a fact that disturbed him greatly, although he was appointed reader. He had done poorly as a student at Oxford, he had annoyed many people through bluntness, and he failed to make every effort to gather official support. His relationship with the Oxford University Press was often strained.

Sweet died on 30 April 1912 in Oxford, of pernicious anemia; he left no children.

== Other interests ==
In Who's Who, 1911, Sweet gave his recreations as:

Climbing, gardening, chemistry, alphabets, in boyhood; swimming, skating, European languages and literatures, in youth; riding, fishing, cycling, literary controversy, spelling and university reform, oriental languages and literatures, in middle age; sociology, spiritualism, music, literary composition, in old age—looked forward to flying: real flying, not with bags and stoves!

== Legacy ==
Sweet has retained a reputation as "the man who taught Europe phonetics". His work established an applied linguistics tradition in language teaching which has continued without interruption to the present day.

A bibliography and Collected Papers were published by H. C. Wyld.

In the preface to his 1913 play Pygmalion, George Bernard Shaw stated that "[Henry] Higgins is not a portrait of Sweet, to whom the adventure of Eliza Doolittle would have been impossible; still, as will be seen, there are touches of Sweet in the play." Leslie Howard portrayed the character of Higgins in the 1938 film Pygmalion; Henry Higgins was notably portrayed by Rex Harrison in the 1956 stage musical My Fair Lady and its 1964 screen adaptation.

The Henry Sweet Society for the History of Linguistic Ideas (founded 1984) is named after him. It holds annual colloquia, and publishes the journal Language and History.
