= Dinka alphabet =

Latin-based alphabet created to write the Dinka language

The Dinka alphabet is used by South Sudanese Dinka people. The written Dinka language is based on the ISO basic Latin alphabet, but with some added letters adapted from the International Phonetic Alphabet. The current orthography is derived from the alphabet developed for the southern Sudanese languages at the Rejaf language conference in 1928. Prior to this, several attempts at adapting the Arabic and Latin scripts to the Dinka language were made, but neither effort was met with large success. Christian missionaries were essential to the development of what became the Dinka alphabet.

== Alphabet ==
Dinka alphabet
Uppercase	A	Ä	B	C	D	Dh	E	Ë	Ɛ	Ɛ̈	G	Ɣ	I	Ï	J	K	L	M	N	Nh	Ny	Ŋ	O	Ö	Ɔ	Ɔ̈	P	R	T	Th	U	W	Y
Lowercase	a	ä	b	c	d	dh	e	ë	ɛ	ɛ̈	g	ɣ	i	ï	j	k	l	m	n	nh	ny	ŋ	o	ö	ɔ	ɔ̈	p	r	t	th	u	w	y

Dinka does not use f, q, s, v, x, and z; and h is used in digraphs only.

=== IPA ===
Dental consonants are distinguished from alveolar by adding a following h. Otherwise, consonants match with their IPA equivalents, except /ɲ/, which is written as ny; /ɟ/, written j; /j/, written y; and /ɾ/, written r. Plain vowels match their IPA equivalents, and the diaeresis indicates breathy voice phonation, which phonemically contrasts with modal voice.

=== Unicode ===
Dinka special letters and digraphs
Uppercase	Ä	Dh	Ë	Ɛ	Ɛ̈	Ɣ	Ï	Nh	Ny	Ŋ	Ö	Ɔ	Ɔ̈	Th
Lowercase	ä	dh	ë	ɛ	ɛ̈	ɣ	ï	nh	ny	ŋ	ö	ɔ	ɔ̈	th
Alternatives	a	d͏h	e	é, e	é, e	gh, q	i	n͏h	n͏y	ng	o	ó, o	ó, o	t͏h
Unicode (hexadecimal)	C4 E4		CB EB	190 25B	190+308 25B+308	194 263	CF EF			14A 14B	D6 F6	186 254	186+308 254+308	

Note that ɛ̈ (open e with trema/umlaut) and ɔ̈ (open o with trema/umlaut) do not exist as precomposed characters in Unicode and must therefore be generated using U+0308, the diaeresis combining diacritic.
