= Marula =

Marula may refer to:

- Sclerocarya birrea, a tree native to Africa
  - Marula oil, extracted from the fruits of Sclerocarya birrea
- Marula, Zimbabwe, a village in Matabeleland South Province
- Marula mine, an open pit mine in South Africa
- Marula (poet) (fl. 13th century or earlier), Sanskrit poet from India
