= Drug use in animals =

Drug use in animals may refer to:

- Animal drug, pharmaceuticals intended for use in animals, especially livestock
- Effect of psychoactive drugs on animals, as a result of research studies
- Recreational drug use in animals, a behavior in which animals seek out intoxicants for their pleasurable effects
- Zoopharmacognosy, a behavior in which animals self-medicate
