= Papam Pasivadu =

1972 film by V. Ramachandra Rao

- Poster
- Directed by: V. Ramachandra Rao
- Written by: Gollapudi Maruti Rao
- Based on: Lost in the Desert by Jamie Uys
- Produced by: Atluri Purnachandra Rao
- Starring: S. V. Ranga Rao; Nagesh; Master Ramu; Devika
- Cinematography: M. Kannappa
- Edited by: Balu
- Music by: Satyam
- Production company: Sri Lakshmi Productions
- Release date: 29 September 1972
- Running time: 139 minutes
- Country: India
- Language: Telugu

Papam Pasivadu (transl. The Innocent Child) is a 1972 Indian Telugu-language adventure drama film directed by V. Ramachandra Rao and written by Gollapudi Maruti Rao. A remake of the South African film Lost in the Desert (1969), it stars S. V. Ranga Rao, Nagesh, Master Ramu and Devika. The film revolves around a boy who gets lost in a desert, and his attempts to find his family. Papam Pasivadu was released on 29 September 1972 and became a commercial success.

== Plot ==
Venugopal and Janaki are a married couple. They soon have a baby boy named Gopi. During Gopi's childhood, he contracts tuberculosis. His family consults their doctor to obtain the best possible treatment for him and they decide to send him to Switzerland with Gopi's uncle Pathy as their pilot. During the journey, Pathy suffers a sudden heart attack, and the plane crashes in Thar Desert. Gopi, with only his dog Tommy accompanying him, faces several obstacles until he reunites with his family.

== Cast ==
- S. V. Ranga Rao as Venugopal
- Nagesh as Pathy
- Master Ramu as Gopi
- M. Prabhakar Reddy as Chakrapani
- V. Nagayya as the doctor
- Kaikala Satyanarayana as Narasimham
- Devika as Janaki
- Suryakantham as Durgamma
- Chhaya Devi as Subbamma
- Master Visweswara Rao

== Production ==
=== Development ===
After the success of Mosagallaku Mosagadu (1971), which was shot mostly in deserts, its producer Atluri Purnachandra Rao wanted his next venture to also be desert-based. Jamie Uys' South African film Lost in The Desert (1969) had just been released in Andhra Pradesh, and caught Rao's attention; he commissioned Gollapudi Maruti Rao to write a story based on this film, which became Papam Pasivadu. The film was produced by Rao's brother Atluri Seshagiri Rao under their home company Sri Lakshmi Productions, V. Ramachandra Rao was hired as director, M. Kannappa for cinematography, Balu for editing and S. Krishna Rao for direction.

=== Casting and filming ===
When Chukkala Veera Venkata Rambabu or "Ramu" first auditioned for the role of Gopi, he was rejected as the makers felt he was too young for the role. However, he was signed on after several negotiations. A Pomeranian named Tommy was cast as Ramu's dog of the same name.

Principal photography took place in March 1972. The film was shot for 27 days in the Thar Desert, during which Ramu and the dog playing Tommy were the only actors. It was shot near the villages in Sam Tehsil in Jaisalmer district. The film unit stayed in tents erected in open spaces outside the villages. The scenes involving Gopi's uncle Pathy (Nagesh), Gopi's father Venugopal (S. V. Ranga Rao), Gopi's mother Janaki (Devika), the airport official Chakrapani (M. Prabhakar Reddy) and Venugopal's brother Narasimham (Kaikala Satyanarayana) were shot at studio sets matching the actual location, and on beaches near Madras. The forest scenes were filmed at Mudumalai in Tamil Nadu.

The makers bought an aircraft from Madras Flying Club which cost around ₹2 lakh. Due to difficulty in obtaining further dates for Nagesh, the makers chose K. Chakravarthy to dub his voice. The final length of the film was 139 minutes, longer than Lost in The Desert which was 90 minutes long.

== Soundtrack ==
The soundtrack was composed by Satyam.

Track listing
No.	Title	Lyrics	Singer(s)	Length
1.	"Manchi Yannadhe Kaanaradhu Ee Manusula lona"	Kosaraju	S. P. Balasubrahmanyam, L. R. Eswari
2.	"Lakshmim Ksheera Samudra Raja"		P. Susheela
3.	"O Babu Maa Babu Nee Kanna Maku Pennidi Yevaru"	C. Narayana Reddy	P. Susheela
4.	"Amma Chudali Ninnu Nannanu Chudali"	Aatreya	P. Susheela
5.	"Ayyo Pasivada Ayyo Papam Pasivada"	Aatreya	Ghantasala

== Marketing ==
Papam Pasivadu was publicised through publicity pamphlets of the film being thrown from helicopters in various towns, a first for Telugu cinema.

== Release and reception ==
Papam Pasivadu was released on 29 September 1972 and became a commercial success.
