= Omnivore =

Animal that can eat and survive on both plants and animals

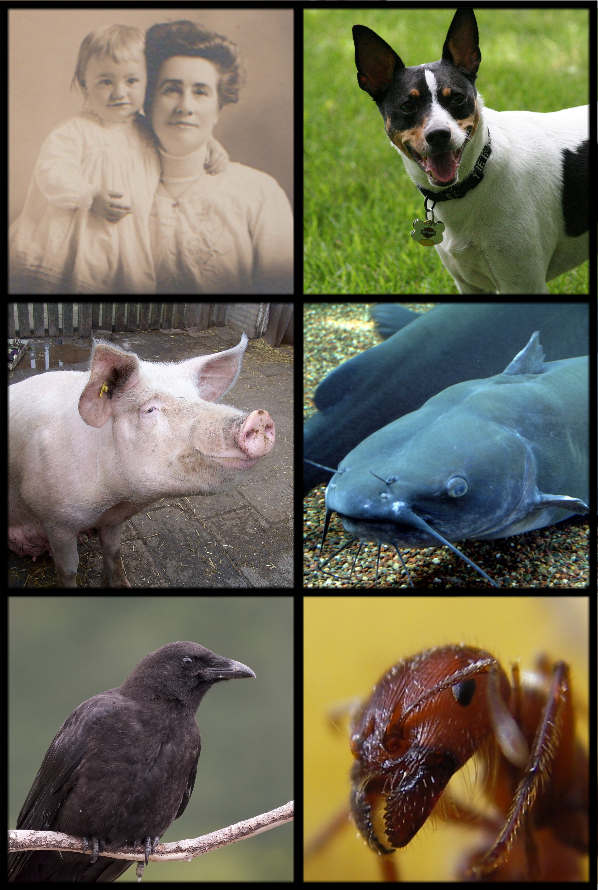
Examples of omnivores. From left to right: humans, dogs, pigs, channel catfish, American crow, gravel ant

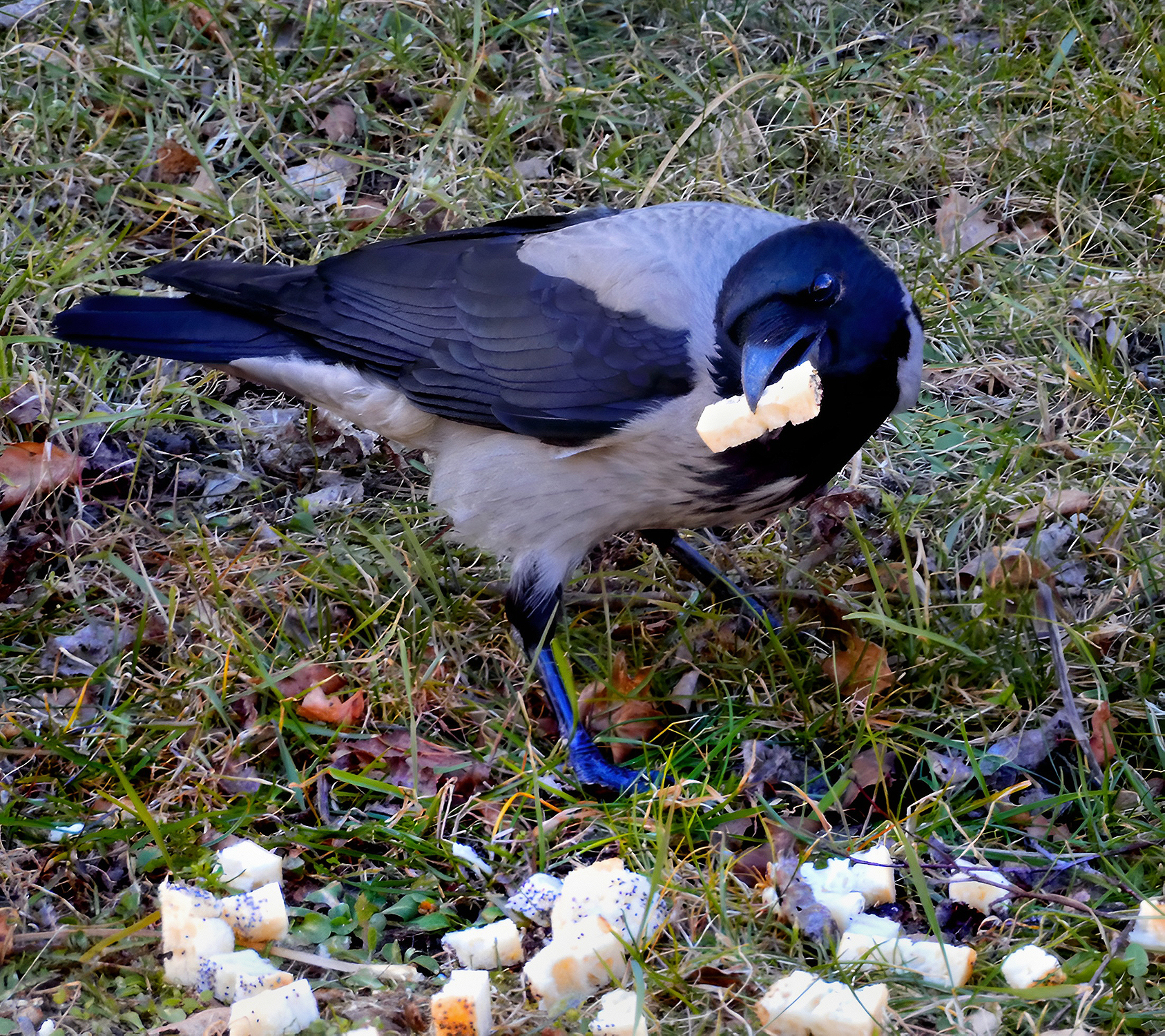
Among birds, the hooded crow is a typical omnivore.

An omnivore (/ˈɒmnɪvɔːr/) is an animal that eats both plant and animal matter. Obtaining energy and nutrients from plant and animal matter, omnivores digest carbohydrates, protein, fat, and fiber, and metabolize the nutrients and energy of the sources absorbed. Often, they have the ability to incorporate food sources such as algae, fungi, and bacteria into their diet.

Omnivores come from diverse backgrounds that often independently evolved sophisticated consumption capabilities. For instance, dogs evolved from primarily carnivorous organisms (Carnivora) while pigs evolved from primarily herbivorous organisms (Artiodactyla). Despite this, physical characteristics such as tooth morphology may be reliable indicators of diet in mammals, with such morphological adaptation having been observed in bears.

The variety of different animals that are classified as omnivores can be placed into further sub-categories depending on their feeding behaviors. Frugivores include cassowaries, orangutans, humans, and grey parrots; insectivores include swallows and pink fairy armadillos; granivores include large ground finches and mice.

All of these animals are omnivores, yet still fall into special niches in terms of feeding behavior and preferred foods. Being omnivores gives these animals more food security in stressful times or makes possible living in less consistent environments.

== Etymology and definitions ==
The word omnivore derives from Latin omnis 'all' and vora, from vorare 'to eat or devour', having been coined by the French and later adopted by the English in the 1800s. Traditionally the definition for omnivory was entirely behavioral by means of simply "including both animal and vegetable tissue in the diet." In more recent times, with the advent of advanced technological capabilities in fields like gastroenterology, biologists have formulated a standardized variation of omnivore used for labeling a species' actual ability to obtain energy and nutrients from materials. This has subsequently conditioned two context-specific definitions.

- Behavioral: This definition is used to specify if a species or individual is actively consuming both plant and animal materials. (e.g. "vegans do not participate in the omnivore based diet.") In the fields of nutrition, sociology and psychology the terms "omnivore" & "omnivory" is often used to distinguish prototypical highly diverse human diet patterns from restricted diet patterns that exclude major categories of food.
- Physiological: This definition is often used in academia to specify species that have the capability to obtain energy and nutrients from both plant and animal matter. (e.g. "humans are omnivores due to their capability to obtain energy and nutrients from both plant and animal materials.")

The taxonomic utility of omnivore's traditional and behavioral definition is limited, since the diet, behavior, and phylogeny of one omnivorous species may be very different from that of another: for instance, an omnivorous pig digging for roots and scavenging for fruit and carrion is taxonomically and ecologically quite distinct from an omnivorous chameleon that eats leaves and insects. The term "omnivory" is also not always comprehensive because it does not deal with mineral foods such as salt licks or with non-omnivores that self-medicate by consuming either plant or animal material which they otherwise would not (i.e. zoopharmacognosy).

=== Classifications, contradictions and difficulties ===
Though Carnivora is a taxon for species classification, no such equivalent exists for omnivores, as omnivores are widespread across multiple taxonomic clades. The Carnivora order does not include all carnivorous species, and not all species within the Carnivora taxon are carnivorous. (The members of Carnivora are formally referred to as carnivorans.) It is common to find physiological carnivores consuming materials from plants or physiological herbivores consuming material from animals, e.g. felines eating grass and deer eating birds. From a behavioral aspect, this would make them omnivores, but from the physiological standpoint, this may be due to zoopharmacognosy. Physiologically, animals must be able to obtain both nutrients and energy from plant and animal materials to be considered omnivorous. Thus, such animals are still able to be classified as carnivores and herbivores when they are just obtaining nutrients from materials originating from sources that do not seemingly complement their classification. For instance, it is well documented that animals such as giraffes, camels, and cattle will gnaw on bones, preferably dry bones, for particular minerals and nutrients. Felines, which are usually regarded as obligate carnivores, occasionally eat grass to regurgitate indigestibles (e.g. hair, bones) and as a laxative.

Occasionally, it is found that animals historically classified as carnivorous may deliberately eat plant material. For example, in 2013, it was considered that American alligators (Alligator mississippiensis) may be physiologically omnivorous once investigations had been conducted on why they occasionally eat fruits. It was suggested that alligators probably ate fruits both accidentally and deliberately.

"Life-history omnivores" is a specialized classification given to organisms that change their eating habits during their life cycle. Some species, such as grazing waterfowl like geese, are known to eat mainly animal tissue at one stage of their lives, but plant matter at another. The same is true for many insects, such as beetles in the family Meloidae, which begin by eating animal tissue as larvae, but change to eating plant matter after they mature. Likewise, many mosquito species in early life eat plants or assorted detritus, but as they mature, males continue to eat plant matter and nectar whereas the females (such as those of Anopheles, Aedes and Culex) also eat blood to reproduce effectively.

== Omnivorous species ==
=== General ===
Although cases exist of herbivores eating meat and carnivores eating plant matter, the classification "omnivore" refers to the adaptation and main food source of the species in general, so these exceptions do not make either individual animals or the species as a whole omnivorous. For the concept of "omnivore" to be regarded as a scientific classification, some clear set of measurable and relevant criteria would need to be considered to differentiate between an "omnivore" and other categories, e.g. faunivore, folivore, and scavenger. Some researchers argue that evolution of any species from herbivory to carnivory or carnivory to herbivory would be rare except via an intermediate stage of omnivory.

=== Omnivorous mammals ===
Various mammals are omnivorous in the wild, such as species of hominids, pigs, badgers, bears, foxes, coatis, civets, hedgehogs, opossums, skunks, squirrels, raccoons, chipmunks, mice, hamsters and rats.

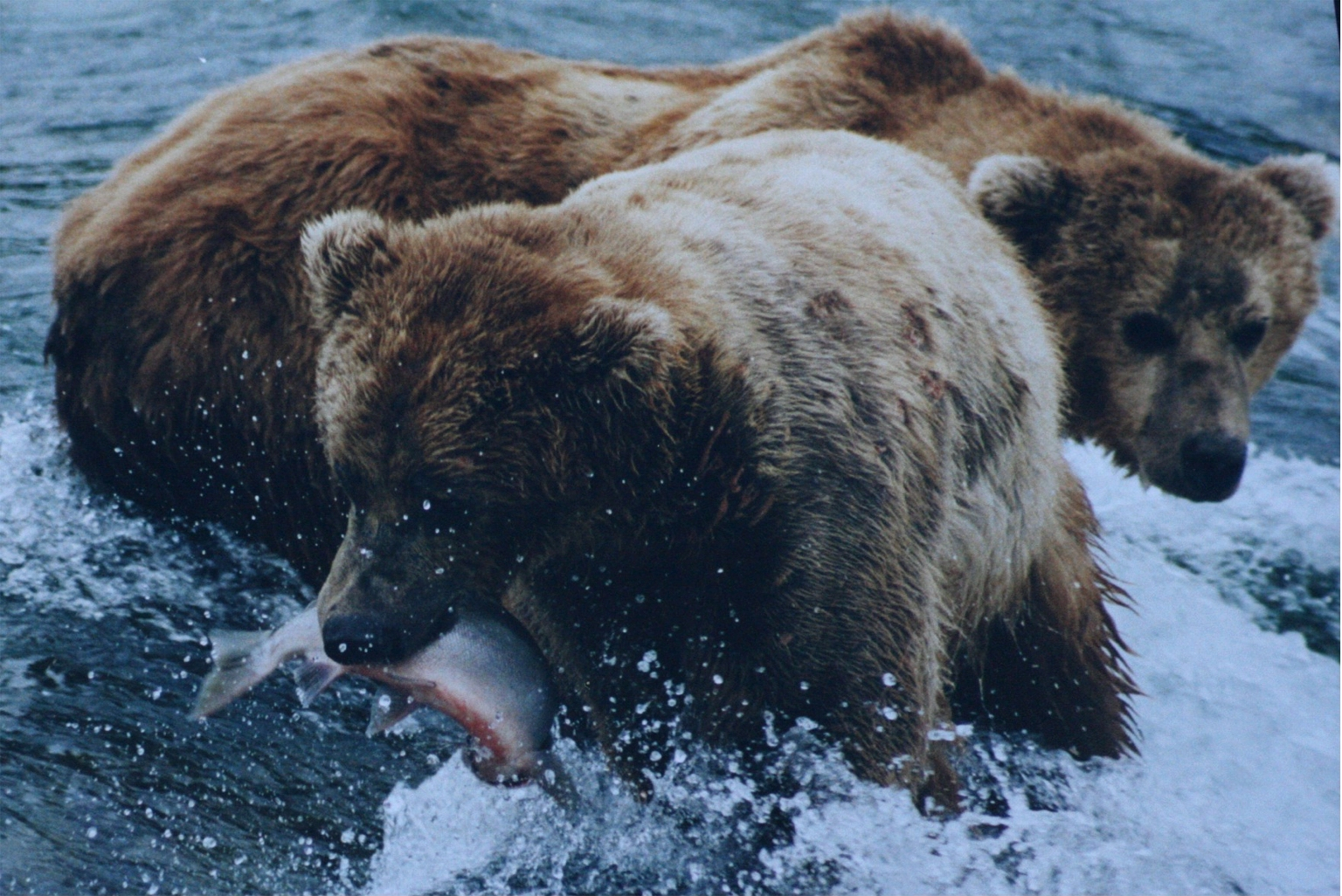
Most bear species are omnivores

Most bear species are omnivores, but individual diets can range from almost exclusively herbivorous (hypocarnivore) to almost exclusively carnivorous (hypercarnivore), depending on what food sources are available locally and seasonally. Polar bears are classified as carnivores, both taxonomically (they are in the order Carnivora), and behaviorally (they subsist on a largely carnivorous diet). Depending on the species of bear, there is generally a preference for one class of food, as plants and animals are digested differently. Canines including wolves, dogs, dingoes, and coyotes eat some plant matter, but they have a general preference and are evolutionarily geared towards meat. However, the maned wolf is a canid whose diet is naturally 50% plant matter.

Like most arboreal species, squirrels are primarily granivores, subsisting on nuts and seeds. However, like virtually all mammals, squirrels avidly consume some animal food when it becomes available. For example, the American eastern gray squirrel has been introduced to parts of Britain, continental Europe and South Africa. Its effect on populations of nesting birds is often serious because of consumption of eggs and nestlings.

=== Other species ===
Various birds are omnivorous, with diets varying from berries and nectar to insects, worms, fish, and small rodents. Examples include cranes, cassowaries, chickens, crows and related corvids, kea, rallidae, and rheas. In addition, some lizards (such as Galapagos Lava Lizard), turtles, fish (such as piranhas and catfish), and invertebrates are omnivorous.

Quite often, mainly herbivorous creatures will eagerly eat small quantities of animal food when it becomes available. Although this is trivial most of the time, omnivorous or herbivorous birds, such as sparrows, often will feed their chicks insects while food is most needed for growth. On close inspection it appears that nectar-feeding birds such as sunbirds rely on the ants and other insects that they find in flowers, not for a richer supply of protein, but for essential nutrients such as cobalt/vitamin b12 that are absent from nectar. Similarly, monkeys of many species eat maggoty fruit, sometimes in clear preference to sound fruit. When to refer to such animals as omnivorous, or otherwise, is a question of context and emphasis, rather than of definition.

== See also ==
- Consumer-resource systems
- Evolution (biology)
- Food chain
- Food energy
- Ingestion
- List of diets
- Mesocarnivore
- Productivity (ecology)
- List of feeding behaviours
