= Daar doer in die bosveld =

1951 South African comedy film

- Directed by: Jamie Uys
- Written by: Jamie Uys
- Produced by: Jamie Uys
- Starring: Jamie Uys; Toit Hettie Uys; Jurg du Preez; Petoors Buks Jouber; Thomas Moema
- Cinematography: Jamie Uys
- Edited by: Jamie Uys
- Music by: Anton de Waal; Ernst van Rooyen; [1]
- Production company: MNet
- Release date: 1951
- Running time: 62 min
- Country: South Africa
- Language: Afrikaans

Daar doer in die bosveld (transl. Far Away in the Bushveld) is an Afrikaans language film and the first film by the South African director Jamie Uys, who directs, writes, produces, edits and stars. His wife Hettie Uys plays the romantic interest. It was originally released in 1951 and holds the record of being the first South African film released in colour.

== Plot ==
Somewhere in the bushveld, Hans Botha is doing the usual farm rounds when his friend and neighbour comes around with an urgent request: please collect the new teacher at the bus stop. The shy Hans is alarmed because he doesn't know how to talk to women but is eventually convinced, setting off in his old jalopy with no brakes. After picking up Martie, he accidentally allows the car to run off and it dumps her in the river. By the time Hans says goodbye, Martie is angry but he is lovestruck.

== Cast ==
- Jamie Uys as Hans Botha
- Hettie Uys as Martie du Toit
- Jurg du Preez as Koos
- Bluks Joubert as Gert Petoors
- Thomas Moema as Ou Thomas
