= Sclerocarya gillettii =

Conservation status
- Endangered (IUCN 3.1)

Scientific classification
- Kingdom: Plantae
- Clade: Tracheophytes
- Clade: Angiosperms
- Clade: Eudicots
- Clade: Rosids
- Order: Sapindales
- Family: Anacardiaceae
- Genus: Sclerocarya
- Species: S. gillettii

Binomial name
- Sclerocarya gillettii Kokwaro

Species of flowering plant

Sclerocarya gillettii is a species of plant in the family Anacardiaceae. It is endemic to Kenya.
