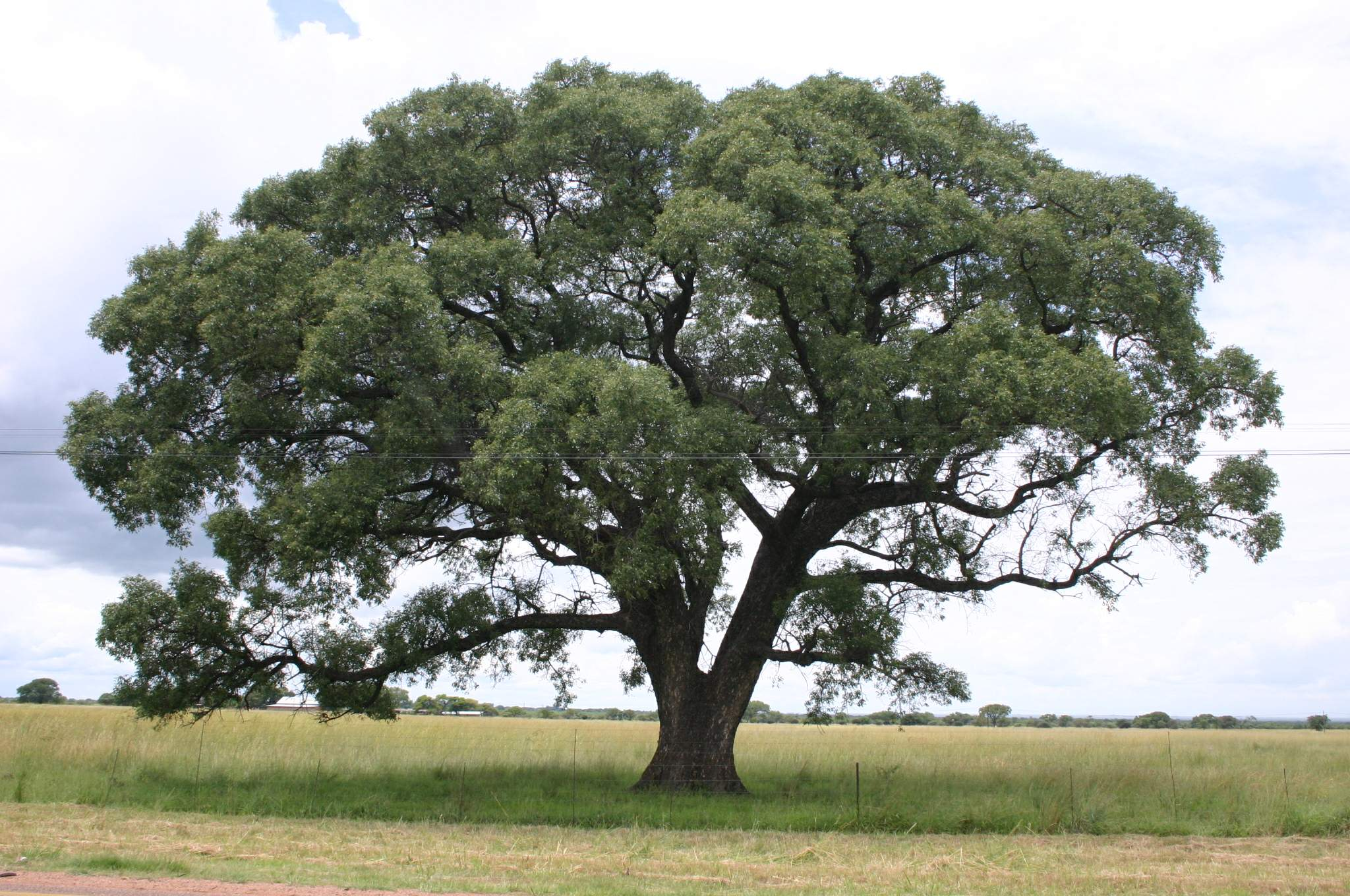
- Sclerocarya birrea

Scientific classification
- Kingdom: Plantae
- Clade: Tracheophytes
- Clade: Angiosperms
- Clade: Eudicots
- Clade: Rosids
- Order: Sapindales
- Family: Anacardiaceae
- Subfamily: Spondiadoideae
- Genus: Sclerocarya; Hochst.

= Sclerocarya =

Genus of flowering plants

Sclerocarya is a genus of plants in the family Anacardiaceae.

There are two species:

- Sclerocarya birrea (A.Rich.) Hochst. — sub-Saharan Africa, Madagascar

S. birrea subsp. afra (Sond.) Kokwaro
S. birrea subsp. multifoliolata (Engl.) Kokwaro
S. birrea subsp. birrea

- Sclerocarya gillettii Kokwaro — eastern Kenya
