= Lost in the Desert =

- DVD cover
- Directed by: Jamie Uys
- Written by: Jamie Uys
- Produced by: Jamie Uys
- Starring: Wynand Uys; Jamie Uys; Pieter Hauptfleisch
- Cinematography: Jamie Uys
- Music by: Classical piano
- Distributed by: Ster-Kinekor Pictures; Columbia Pictures
- Release date: 1969
- Running time: 98 minutes
- Country: South Africa
- Languages: English; Afrikaans

Lost in the Desert, initially released as Dirkie, is a 1969 South African film written, produced and directed by Jamie Uys under the name of Jamie Hayes. It was filmed in Techniscope and Technicolor. Uys himself plays Anton De Vries, a concert pianist whose 8-year-old son Dirkie is the central character. Dirkie is played by Uys's real-life son Wynand Uys, credited as Dirkie Hayes.

The plot was paralleled two years later by the far more successful "Walkabout".

== Plot ==
Eight-year-old Dirkie DeVries (Wynand Uys, credited as Dirkie Hayes), is flying with his Uncle Pete (Pieter Hauptfleisch) and his dog a Cairn Terrier, across the Kalahari Desert in a small plane, piloted by Uncle Pete, who partway into the flight has a heart attack and partially loses control of the plane. Thanks to his struggles to land safely in the desert even while suffering the heart attack, the crash is not as serious as it might have been otherwise, and, while Pete himself dies, Dirkie and his small pet dog survive, and the bulk of the story follows Dirkie's various adventures while he struggles to survive the harsh desert conditions, including an encounter with Kalahari Desert Bushmen, who give him help, but abandon him after an unfortunate misunderstanding concerning Dirkie's dog.

In his attempt to light a fire to keep the hyenas away he blows up the plane destroying the radio transmitter. This also changes the colour of the plane. The helicopters are looking for a red and white striped plane, but it is now black.

The story alternates between Dirkie in the desert and Dirkie's father Anton DeVries (played by the director Jamie Uys) and follows his increasingly desperate efforts to locate his son, including having two million leaflets specially printed and spread over the desert from a plane, containing instructions for Dirkie on how to survive in the desert, and assuring him that his father loves him and won't give up trying to rescue him.

Dirkie fares remarkably well and appears to be saved when he meets a bushman and his son. However, when they feed him meat he misunderstands and thinks he is eating his own dog. He runs off and throws stones at the bushman. This ingratitude is not received well and the bushman sets fire to his own hut and wanders away with his son. Dirkie finds the dog, but cannot entice the bushman back, and the bushman now throws stones at Dirkie. He wanders deeper into the desert and collapses.

Ultimately Anton travels to the Kalahari Desert himself after everything else fails to make progress. (He has had to mortgage his house to pay for the expenses of finding Dirkie after a newspaper backs out of an earlier offer to assist with expenses.) In the desert, he meets one of the Bushmen who had earlier met Dirkie, and gets information about the direction Dirkie was last seen going in, and he is finally able to find Dirkie, who looks as if he is close to death. His dog is still with him, although injured. The film ends with Dirkie (unconscious) in his father's arms, together with his little dog (still alert), both being carried back to the vehicle his father had travelled there in.

== Music ==
Music plays a very important role in this film, especially classical piano music resulting from Dirkie's father being a concert pianist. Classical piano music is used several times in the film's soundtrack: particularly compositions by Franz Liszt and Frédéric Chopin, to the point that Liszt's Liebestraum no. 3 in A♭ major (S./G. 541, R. 211, no. 3) and Chopin's Polonaise no. 6 in A♭ major, op. 53 ("Polonaise héroïque") almost become de facto themes for the film.

Some of the climactic portions of the Liebestraum form a sweeping sonic backdrop to early scenes in the desert (before the crash landing), showing a lunch stop in the empty desert and then taking off and resuming the flight.

There is a striking and emotionally intense scene in which Dirkie's father is practising the Polonaise at home and his worry about Dirkie causes him to have a sudden emotional breakdown, in which he interrupts his playing by hitting the piano's keyboard angrily with his fists and producing loud crashing discords.

In addition, the very opening scene of the actual story (after the differing introductions to the two versions of the film) shows Dirkie and his father playing Chopsticks together on the piano as a duet.

Other than classical pieces, original music for the film was composed by Art Heatley and Sam Sklair with a faux African musical cue by William Loose. One German web site also credits Gilbert Gibson as another composer for the film. The DVD credits only Sklair for original music.

The Australian jazz singer Edwin Duff (1928–2012) is credited in the end titles as singing the theme song "Wait for Tomorrow". However current versions of the movie do not include the song.

== Release ==
The film was first released in 1969.

== Reactions and legacy ==
The film was not widely available for many years after its original release, but discussions on film-related forums and personal blogs show that aspects of the film are remembered very vividly by those who saw it as children.

Discussions and memories of the film posted online suggest that viewers appear to have been haunted by scenes from the film for many years, without being able to identify the film itself. Certain scenes are regarded with some unease or horror, possibly even casting doubt on whether the film is suitable for children, although its overall style seems to suggest that it was conceived as a children's film.

Lead actor Wynand Uys did not act again. He and his wife Marie-Tinka ran the Otters Den nature reserve and outdoor activity centre near Hoedspruit, South Africa where he is also the chair of the local flying club.

Director Jamie Uys became best known outside South Africa for making the first two films in The Gods Must Be Crazy series. He died in 1996.

The film was released on DVD in 2005. On the cover the credits for Jamie Hayes and Dirkie Hayes use their real family name Uys.

The UK channel Talking Pictures TV screens the film several times a year.

== Differences between the two language versions ==
Lost in the Desert was shot in two versions, one in Afrikaans and the other in English. The Afrikaans version appeared in 1969 under the title Dirkie, and the English version appeared in either 1969 or 1970 (possibly varying according to country) under the title Dirkie Lost in the Desert, which was sometimes referred to and marketed as Lost in the Desert, which is possibly an alternative official title for the English version.

The film was released on DVD in 2005 (copyright 1999), and this disc contains both versions of the film, selectable from the front menu. The English version is about 70 minutes long, and the Afrikaans version rather shorter.

Most of the scenes are exactly the same in both versions, but both contain a few scenes which are not included in the other. For example, the Afrikaans version starts with a scene showing Dirkie's father Anton Hayes, who is a concert pianist, playing Frédéric Chopin's Fantaisie-Impromptu in C♯ minor, Op. 66 (posth.) before an audience. Instead of this, the English version substitutes some panoramic scenes from the Kalahari Desert (the setting for most of the story), with an announcer narrating a brief history of the desert. One possible reason for this difference might be that the director may have thought that an English-speaking audience might find a little introductory information about the Kalahari Desert useful, but that an Afrikaans audience might find it superfluous. The opening concert scene in the Afrikaans version adds nothing to the story beyond establishing the fact that Dirkie's father is a concert pianist.

Also, the presence or absence of music during a prominent scene early in the film differs between the two versions.

There are also a few very brief scenes, some only of seconds' duration, that are in one version of the film but not the other. However, overall, the Afrikaans version is significantly shorter, thus suggesting that the English one may be more "complete".

One account of the film in discussion forums suggests that, in the 2005 re-release of the film on DVD, the reason for the Afrikaans version being shorter might be that the last reel of this version was lost and so the film was simply truncated on DVD, thus accounting for its reportedly abrupt ending.

== Telugu remake ==
A hugely popular remake was made in Telugu, a South Indian language, in 1972, with the name Papam Pasivadu with a few minor changes in the storyline to suit the local audience.
