= Animals Are Beautiful People =

1974 South African nature documentary film

- DVD release cover
- Directed by: Jamie Uys
- Written by: Jamie Uys
- Produced by: Jamie Uys
- Cinematography: Jamie Uys
- Edited by: Jamie Uys
- Production company: Mimosa Films
- Distributed by: Warner Bros. Pictures; Ster-Kinekor
- Release dates: 31 January 1974 (South Africa); 11 November 1974 (USA)
- Running time: 92 minutes
- Country: South Africa
- Language: English

Animals Are Beautiful People (also called Beautiful People) is a 1974 South African nature documentary written, produced, directed, filmed and edited by Jamie Uys, about the wildlife in Southern Africa, presented with comedic elements. It was filmed in the Namib Desert, the Kalahari Desert and at the Okavango River and Okavango Delta. It was the recipient of the 1974 Golden Globe Award for Best Documentary Film.

The film, a critical and commercial success, was independently made by Uys, also known for his later South African-Motswana comedy The Gods Must Be Crazy (1980).

== General description ==
The film begins in the Namib desert, with the narrator saying: "You'd think nobody could make a living here." But the film proves the opposite and shows the lives of the animals that live there. The narrator concludes: "But to the Oryx and the little creatures of the Namib, this waterless, hostile desert is paradise."

The second third of the film shows the rich life at the Okavango River and Okavango Delta and the last third of the film focuses on life in the Kalahari desert.

== Criticisms ==
One scene depicts baboons, elephants, giraffes, warthogs and other African animals eating fermented fruit of the Marula tree. The animals then appear intoxicated, and they stagger around to comic effect, before nightfall comes and they fall asleep. Some experts have claimed that some scenes were likely staged; elephants would be too large, for example, and drink too much water (diluting the alcohol) to get intoxicated.

Another scene depicts a honey badger following a honeyguide to a bees' nest. Scientists have found no evidence that honeyguides guide honey badgers in real life, and the production crew later admitted that the scene was staged by having a tame honey badger follow a taxidermy model of a honeyguide on a fishing line.

== Classical music ==
The film uses classical music and especially well-known pieces to support a scene. A few examples:

- Smetana's "Die Moldau", throughout the movie, especially during the river scenes.
- Alain Poinsot's "Romance", used in the scene when the Palmato Gecko is slowly digging in the sand.
- Khachaturian's "Sabre Dance" from Gayane ballet, during the scene where the sidewinder hunts geckos.
- "Brahms Hungarian Dance No. 5" with acrobatic baboons
- Amilcare Ponchielli's "Dance of the Hours" during the sociable weaver birds scene
- Tchaikovsky's "Chinese Dance" during the seed-releasing of the Stapelia flower
- Tchaikovsky's "Dance of the Reed Flutes" during the ostrich courtship scene
- Tchaikovsky's "Waltz of the Flowers", showing the miracle of the blooming desert
- Franz Liszt's "Les préludes, symphonic poem No.3", near the end of the film, during the cloud formation scene
- Weber's "Invitation to the Dance" orchestrated by Berlioz, featuring the animals' celebration of Paradise's return

== Featured species ==
This incomplete list does include almost all mentioned species.

- Baboon
- Cape Buffalo
- Chameleon
- Cheetah
- Chimpanzee
- Duck
- Egg eating snake
- Elephant
- Gecko
- Gemsbok
- Giraffe
- Go-away-bird
- Gorilla
- Grey crowned crane
- Hippopotamus
- Honey badger
- Honeyguide
- Hornbill
- Hyena
- Impala
- Jacana
- Kingfisher
- Kudu
- Lion
- Marabou stork
- Meerkat
- Mongoose
- Oryx
- Ostrich
- Pelican
- Porcupine
- Rhinoceros
- Secretarybird
- Scorpion
- Sidewinder
- Springbok
- Stapelia
- Stone-curlew
- Tambuti
- Turaco
- Warthog
- Weaverbird
- Wildebeest
- Zebra
