= Jamie Uys =

South African film director (1921–1996)

- Uys circa 1990
- Born: Jacobus Johannes Uys; 30 May 1921; Boksburg, Transvaal, Union of South Africa
- Died: 29 January 1996 (aged 74); Johannesburg, South Africa
- Years active: 1951–1989
- Spouse: Hettie Uys

Jacobus Johannes Uys (/eɪs/ ayss; 30 May 1921 – 29 January 1996), better known as Jamie Uys, was a South African film director, best known for directing the 1980 comedy film The Gods Must Be Crazy and its 1989 sequel The Gods Must Be Crazy II. Uys also directed the 1974 documentary film Animals Are Beautiful People.

== Early life ==
Before his foray into film, Uys was a mathematics teacher in his hometown of Boksburg.

He then married Hettie, a fellow mathematics teacher, and the couple started farming and opening trading posts along the Palala River.

He was later appointed local magistrate and Justice of the Peace. In an interview, he stated, "Every Tuesday I crossed the wildest country and swam through rivers to get to the police post where I could hold court".

== Career ==
During his career he directed 24 films and owned a company with South African film producer Tommie Meyer.

He made his debut as a film director in 1951 with the Afrikaans-language film Daar doer in die bosveld.

Animals Are Beautiful People is about the plant and animal life in South Africa, Namibia, Botswana and Zimbabwe, especially desert creatures. A highlight of the film includes a scene with elephants, warthogs, baboons, ostriches and other animals staggering around after eating rotten, fermented marula fruit. Uys claimed to have made the animals intoxicated on fermented marula fruits, however this later proved to be a lie, with the film crew having soaked the fruits in alcohol, prior to the scene being filmed.

His most financially successful and best-known film is The Gods Must Be Crazy, a comedy first released in 1980.

The film features a San hunter/gatherer named N!xau in the lead role. The story starts with a Coca-Cola bottle that was thrown out of an airplane, fell into the Kalahari Desert and was found by a San tribe. As this was the only "modern" object in their world, it led to fights before it was decided that the bottle had to be returned to the Gods, who must have sent it in the first place. The character played by N!xau is given the task to return it.

The movie generated extensive word-of-mouth success in Europe, Japan and North America, with the movie rights later being sold to 45 countries. It spawned a less successful sequel, The Gods Must Be Crazy II.

Uys also made the film Lost in the Desert, which tells the story of 8-year-old Dirkie Hayes's efforts to survive in the desert after surviving a plane crash, whilst his father Anton mounts increasingly desperate efforts to find him.

As well as directing the film, Uys also played the part of Anton, and his son Wynand Uys played the part of Dirkie. Some early sources and credits name the director and actor of Anton's part as Jamie Hayes, and name Wynand Uys as Dirkie Hayes, but the relatively recent DVD release of the movie is attributed to their real names.

Uys's other well-known film was Funny People in 1977, a comedy in the same genre as Candid Camera in the United States, putting unsuspecting people in embarrassing positions. These include a talking postbox, with the voice of a man claiming to be trapped inside, who asks a passerby for help. When the passerby returns with his friends, the "talking" postbox is silent, and his friends accuse him of being drunk.

The sequel, Funny People II, was released in 1983, and features a young Arnold Vosloo who later found fame in Hollywood.

== Awards ==
In 1981 Uys received the Grand Prix at the Festival International du Film de Comedie of Vevey for The Gods Must Be Crazy, and in 1974 he received the Golden Globe for best documentary for Animals Are Beautiful People.

== Personal life ==
Jamie Uys lived in Johannesburg and had a modest A-frame house at 262 Die Heide Street in Paradise Beach, a quiet coastal resort 5 km west of the surfers' paradise Jeffreys Bay (Eastern Cape). The house was 300 meters from the ocean and for many years had no electricity, only paraffin and later gas lamps. In the late 1970s and early 1980s he built a luxurious house on the beachfront, a couple of hundred meters away from his old A-frame.

A keen amateur botanist, Uys had a herbarium and he collected a variety of plant specimens.

Uys was passionate about the outdoors and would often ride his bicycle through the veld. He also built model airplanes.

== Death ==
Jamie Uys died of a heart attack in 1996 at the age of 74 in Johannesburg.

== Selected filmography ==
=== Feature Films ===
Year	Title	Director	Writer	Producer	Cinematographer	Editor	Note
1951	Daar Doer in Die Bosveld	Yes	Yes	Yes	Yes	Yes	
1953	50-50	Yes	Yes	No	No	Yes	
1954	Daar Doer in die Stad	Yes	Yes	Yes	No	No	
1955	Geld Soos Bossies	Yes	Yes	Yes	No	Yes	Co-written with Jok Uys
1956	Die Bosvelder	Yes	Yes	Yes	No	Yes	
1961	Doodkry is Min	Yes	Yes	Yes	No	No	
1961	Hans en die Rooinek	Yes	Yes	Yes	No	No	
1962	Lord Oom Piet	Yes	Yes	Yes	No	No	Co-written with Emil Nofal
1964	Dingaka	Yes	Yes	Yes	No	No	
1966	All the Way to Paris	Yes	Yes	Yes	No	No	
1967	Die Professor en die Prikkelpop	Yes	Yes	Yes	No	No	also known as The Professor and the Beauty Queen
1969	Lost in the Desert	Yes	Yes	Yes	Yes	No	Also known as Dirkie
1974	Animals Are Beautiful People	Yes	Yes	Yes	Yes	Yes	Documentary; Also known as Beautiful People
1976	Funny People	Yes	Yes	Yes	Yes	Yes	Co-directed with Kobus Kruger
1980	The Gods Must Be Crazy	Yes	Yes	Yes	Yes	Yes	
1983	Funny People 2	Yes	Yes	Yes	No	No	
1989	The Gods Must Be Crazy II	Yes	Yes	No	No	No	final film role
