= Recreational drug use in animals =

Ingestion of drugs by animals for pleasure

Several non-human animal species are said to engage in apparent recreational drug use, that is, the intentional ingestion of psychoactive substances in their environment for pleasure, though claims of such behavior in the wild are often controversial. This is distinct from zoopharmacognosy, in which animals ingest or topically apply non-food substances for their health benefits, as a form of self-medication.

== Alcohol ==
Species that have been reported to consume alcohol in the wild include Bohemian waxwings, fruit bats, tree shrews, and bees, though there is no evidence that these species consume alcohol preferentially. Anecdotal reports of drunken animals in the wild include moose, parrots, orangutans, and a badger.

=== Birds ===
Cedar waxwing, bohemian waxwing, common starling are frequently studied species when examining the effects of alcohol consumption in birds.

Cedar waxwings have been observed flying while intoxicated by alcohol from overwintered hawthorn pommes ("haws"), resulting in crashes that lead to their deaths.

=== Mammals ===
Alcohol dehydrogenase class IV, or ADH4, an enzyme involved in the metabolization of alcohol, first appeared in hominoids around 10 million years ago, around the time Homininae diverged into hominins and gorillas.

==== Chimpanzees ====
Common chimpanzees have been observed eating overripe breadfruit and sharing it with fellow members of their troop. While the observed fermented fruits contained anywhere from 0.01 to 0.61% ABV, chimps mostly eat fruit; the effect is likely noticeable but not enough to bring them to inebriation, which would put them at greater risk of predation or bodily injury.

Wild chimpanzees in Bossou, Guinea, have been observed consuming fermented sap from the raffia palm (Raphia hookeri) from 1995 to 2012. They use simple tools to access the sap, which averages 3.1% ABV. This behavior suggests that ethanol does not deter feeding and indicates that the last common ancestor of African apes and humans likely consumed foods containing ethanol.

Chimpanzees at Bossou consumed large amounts of ethanol and showed signs of intoxication. Although detailed behavioral data before and after drinking was rarely collected, some chimps rested right after consuming fermented sap.

==== Vervet monkeys ====
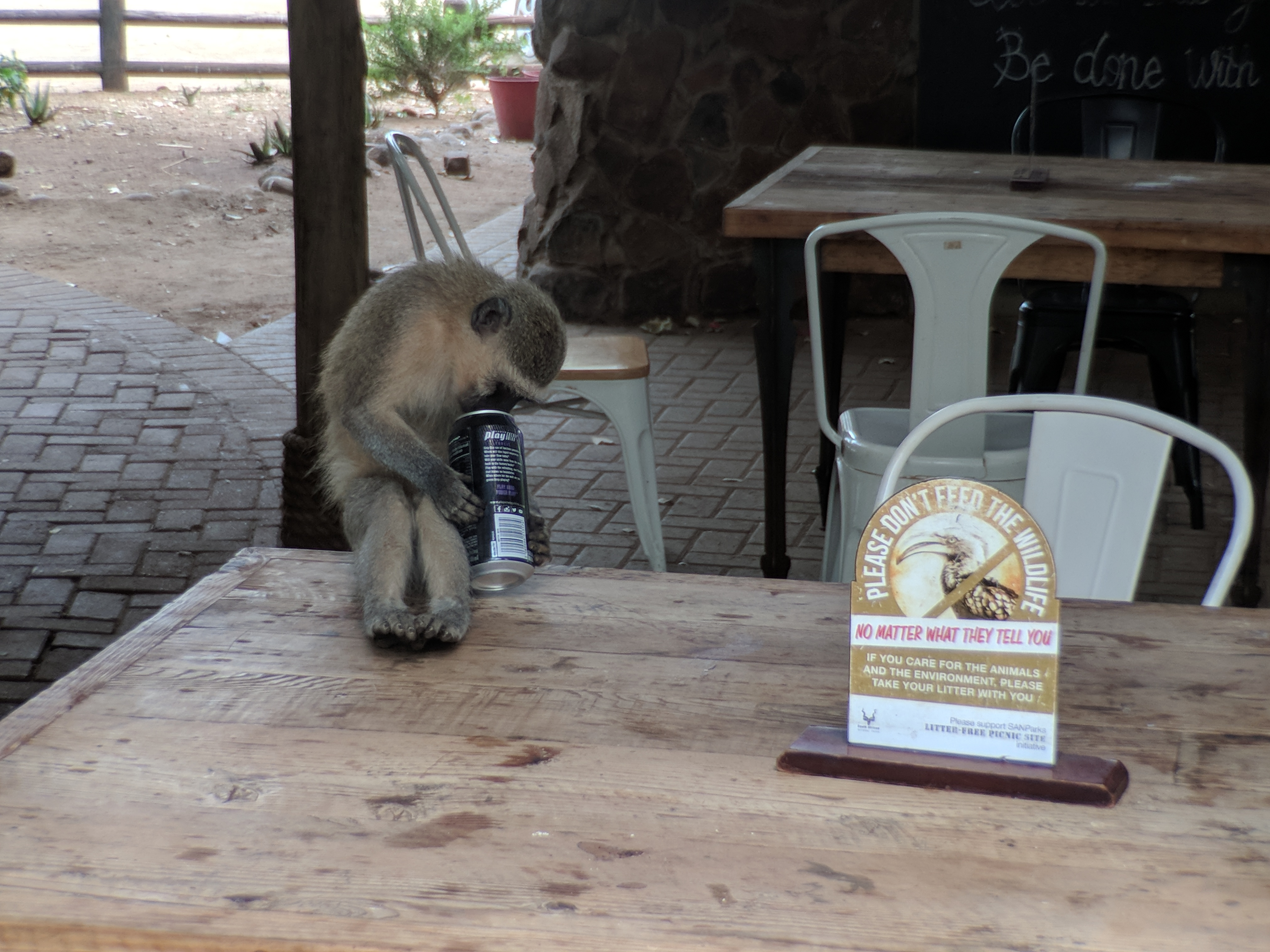
Vervet monkey consuming a human beverage (in this case non-alcoholic)

Some vervet monkeys in the Caribbean, particularly teenaged individuals, exhibit a preference for alcoholic beverages over non-alcoholic ones, a taste which likely developed due to the availability of fermented sugar cane juice from local plantations. On Saint Kitts, these monkeys often raid bars and tourist beaches for alcoholic drinks, and become visibly inebriated. The proportions of the monkey population that do not drink, that drink in moderation, and that drink to excess mirror those proportions in humans.

==== Elephants ====
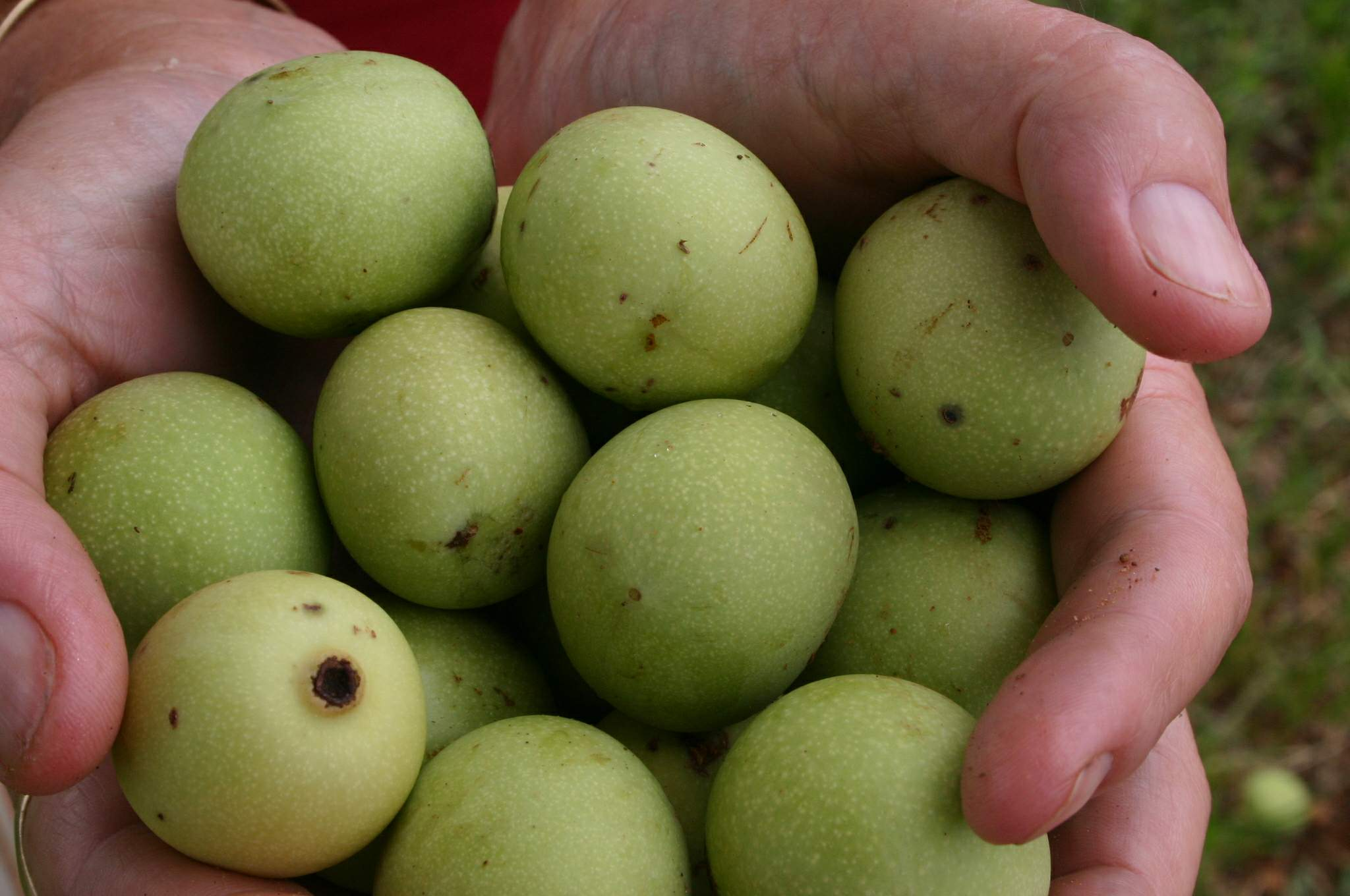
According to legend, the fruit of the marula tree is sought by elephants for its alcohol content when ripe.

South African legends, recorded as early as the 1830s by naturalist Adulphe Delegorgue, describe elephants seeking out the fermented fruit of the marula tree, and showing signs of intoxication, including increased aggression, after doing so. This behavior was controversially depicted in the 1974 documentary Animals Are Beautiful People: the crew of the film reportedly staged the scene, either by soaking the fruit in alcohol before allowing animals to eat it, or by simply injecting the animals with a veterinary anesthetic to elicit symptoms of intoxication. Studies have concluded that this behavior is a myth. One of the studies instead attributed their aggression to the value of the trees as a food source. Yet it may be possible that another intoxicant is at play – elephants are also known to eat the bark of the tree, which often contains toxic beetle pupae.

== Other intoxicants ==
=== Bees ===
A 2010 study from the University of Haifa reported that bees prefer nectar containing nicotine and caffeine over that without, and suggested that this preference may be part of the reward system driving the mutualistic feeding behavior.

=== Cats ===
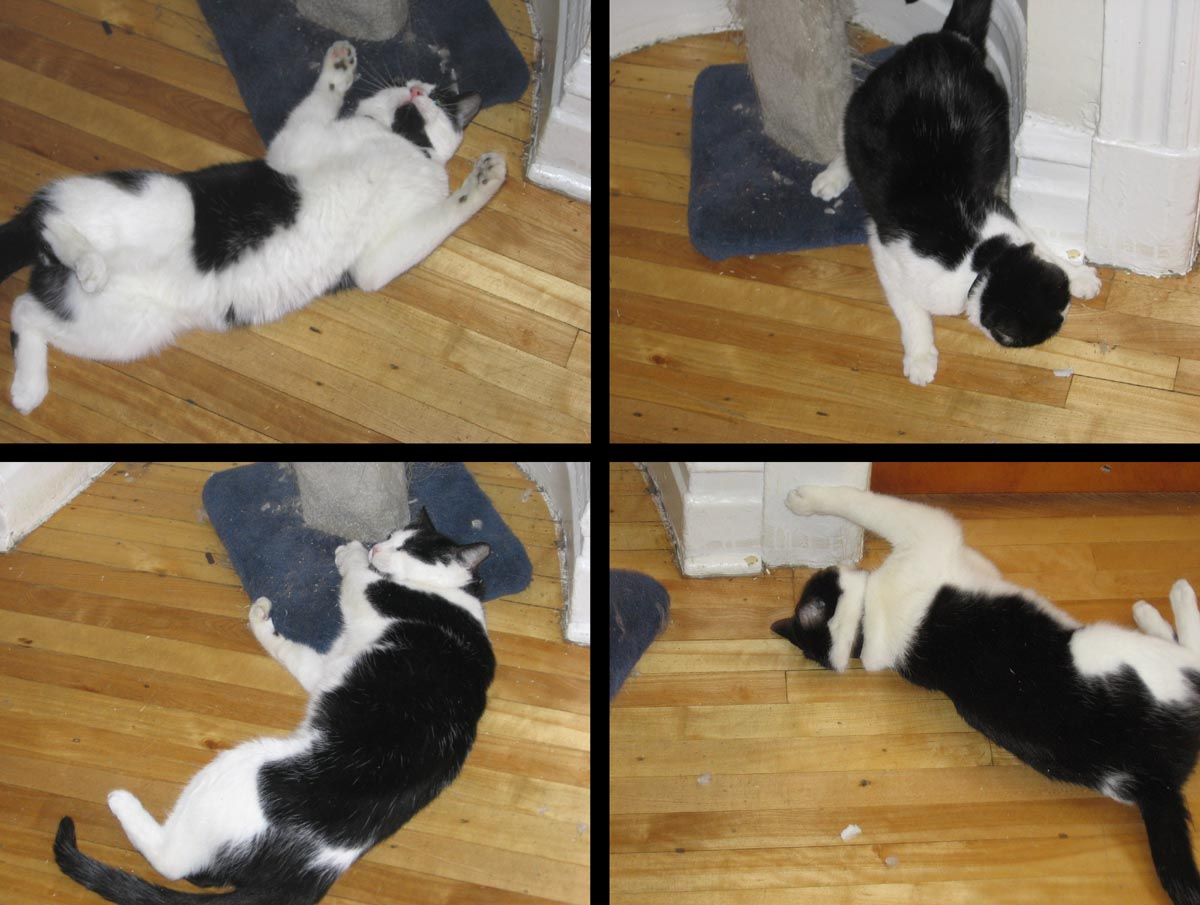
A domestic cat under the influence of catnip

About 70% of domestic cats are attracted to, and affected by, the plant Nepeta cataria, also known as catnip. The plant also affects some wild cats, including tigers, though the percentage of these cats affected is unknown. Cats sniff, lick, and sometimes chew the plant, and may rub against it, with their cheeks and whole body, by rolling over it. If cats consume concentrated extract of the plant, they quickly show signs of overexcitement, including violent twitching, profuse salivation, and sexual arousal. The reaction is caused by volatile terpenoids called nepetalactones present in the plant. Although these are mildly toxic and repel insects from the plant, their concentration is too low to poison cats.

=== Dolphins ===
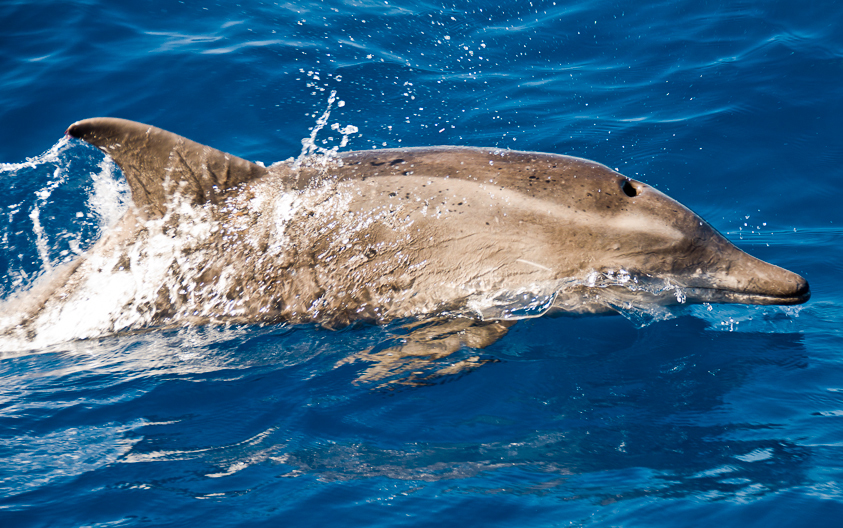
A rough-toothed dolphin

In 1995, the marine biologist Lisa Steiner reported that a group of rough-toothed dolphins near the Azores were pushing around inflated puffer fish and behaving lethargically. Puffer fish defensively excrete tetrodotoxin, which might have been having an intoxicating effect on the dolphins. This behavior was also reported in the 2014 BBC documentary Dolphins – Spy in the Pod. However, tetrodotoxin is not known to be psychoactive, and only produces numbness, tingling, and lightheadedness in small doses, while in larger doses it is extremely toxic. For these reasons, marine biologist Christie Wilcox has expressed doubt that dolphins dose themselves with the toxin intentionally.

=== Lemurs ===
Black lemurs have been documented gently biting toxic millipedes, which causes them to salivate, and then rubbing their saliva and the millipede secretions on their fur. The millipede toxins, including cyanide and benzoquinone, are thought to act primarily as an insect repellent, protecting the lemurs from diseases such as malaria, thus making this behavior a form of zoopharmacognosy. However, the toxins also appear to have a narcotic effect on the lemurs, causing them to enter an apparently blissful state, which may serve as a reward for the behavior.

=== Wallabies ===
In Tasmania, wallabies have been reported repeatedly entering commercial poppy fields, consuming the plants, and showing signs of intoxication.

== See also ==
- Maladaptation, a trait that is more harmful than helpful
