= Marula oil =

Oil from the seeds of Sclerocarya birrea

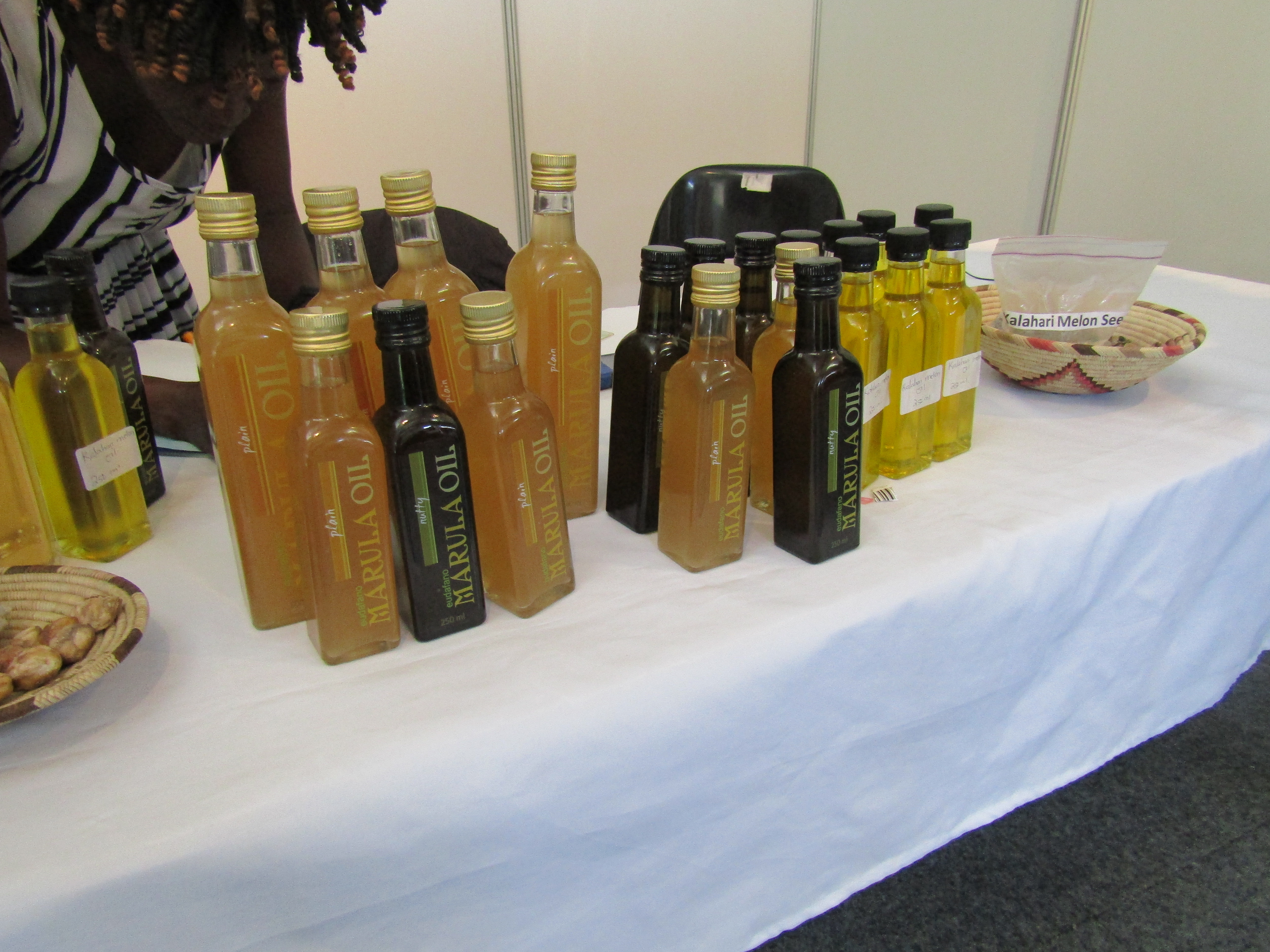
Marula oil on sale at Ongwediva Trade Fair 2016

Marula oil is extracted from the kernels (nuts) of the fruits of the marula tree (Sclerocarya birrea) in the family Anacardiaceae. There are two types of marula oil: the oil extracted from the seeds, and the oil extracted from the nut's hard shell. Marula oil is traditionally used in cosmetics, in food as a cooking oil and meat preservative, and to treat leather. Marula oil may be used as body lotion. In Namibia, marula fruit is used to create products like juice and jam.

== Chemical composition ==
Marula oil contains monounsaturated fatty acids, particularly oleic acid. The fatty acid composition of marula oil includes:

Monounsaturated fatty acids:

- Oleic acid (70–78%)

Polyunsaturated fatty acids:

- Linoleic acid (4–7%)
- Alpha-linolenic acid (0.1–0.7%)
- Arachidonic acid (0.3–0.7%)

Saturated fatty acids:

- Palmitic acid (9–12%)
- Stearic acid (5–8%)

Tocopherols, sterols, flavonoids, procyanidin, gallotannin and catechins are also found in marula oil.

== Physical properties ==
Marula oil has a clear, light yellow colour and a nutty aroma. It has a saponification value of approximately 188–199 and a specific gravity of 0.91–0.92 (at 15 °C).

== Traditional uses ==
The Tsonga people of South Africa and Mozambique have used the oil as a moisturising body lotion for women and as a massage oil for babies. In the past, Namibian women used marula oil rather than water to clean themselves.

Marula oil is used in diets, especially for people of the Inhambane Province in Mozambique, Owamboland in north central Namibia, Northern KwaZulu-Natal in South Africa, and the Zvishavane district of Zimbabwe. Marula has a diet role for bushmen and Bantus. The Venda use the oil from the kernels to preserve meat, which enables it to last up to a year. Marula oil is considered a delicacy by local people, and is added to many traditional and modern recipes.
