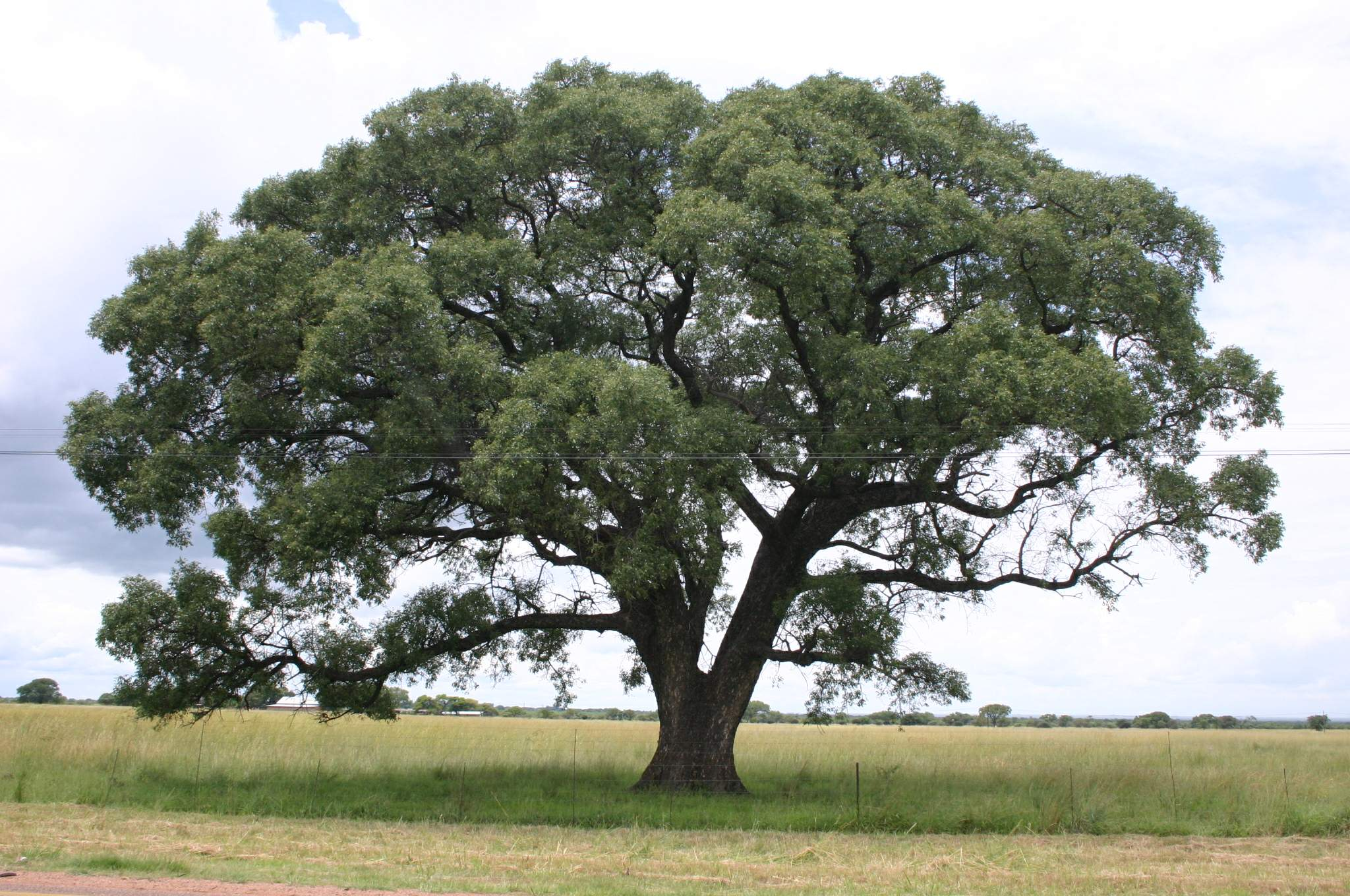

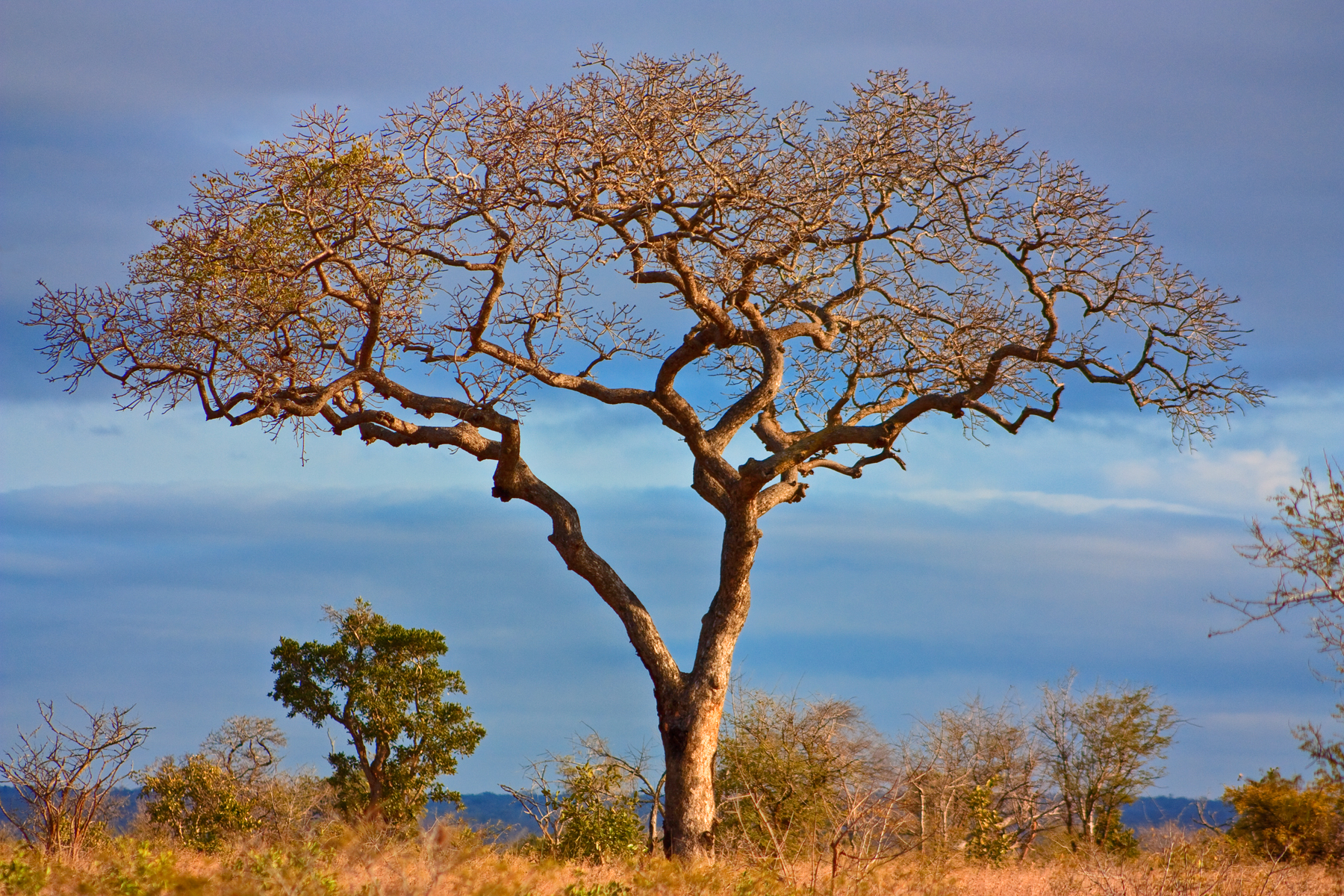
- S. birrea with and without foliage

Conservation status
- Least Concern (IUCN 3.1)

Scientific classification
- Kingdom: Plantae
- Clade: Tracheophytes
- Clade: Angiosperms
- Clade: Eudicots
- Clade: Rosids
- Order: Sapindales
- Family: Anacardiaceae
- Genus: Sclerocarya
- Species: S. birrea

Binomial name
- Sclerocarya birrea (A.Rich.) Hochst.

Subspecies
- Sclerocarya birrea subsp. afra (Sond.) Kokwaro; Sclerocarya birrea subsp. birrea; Sclerocarya birrea subsp. multifoliolata (Engl.) Kokwaro

Synonyms
- Spondias birrea A. Rich.; Poupartia birrea (A. Rich.) Aubrév.

= Sclerocarya birrea =

Marula

Species of tree

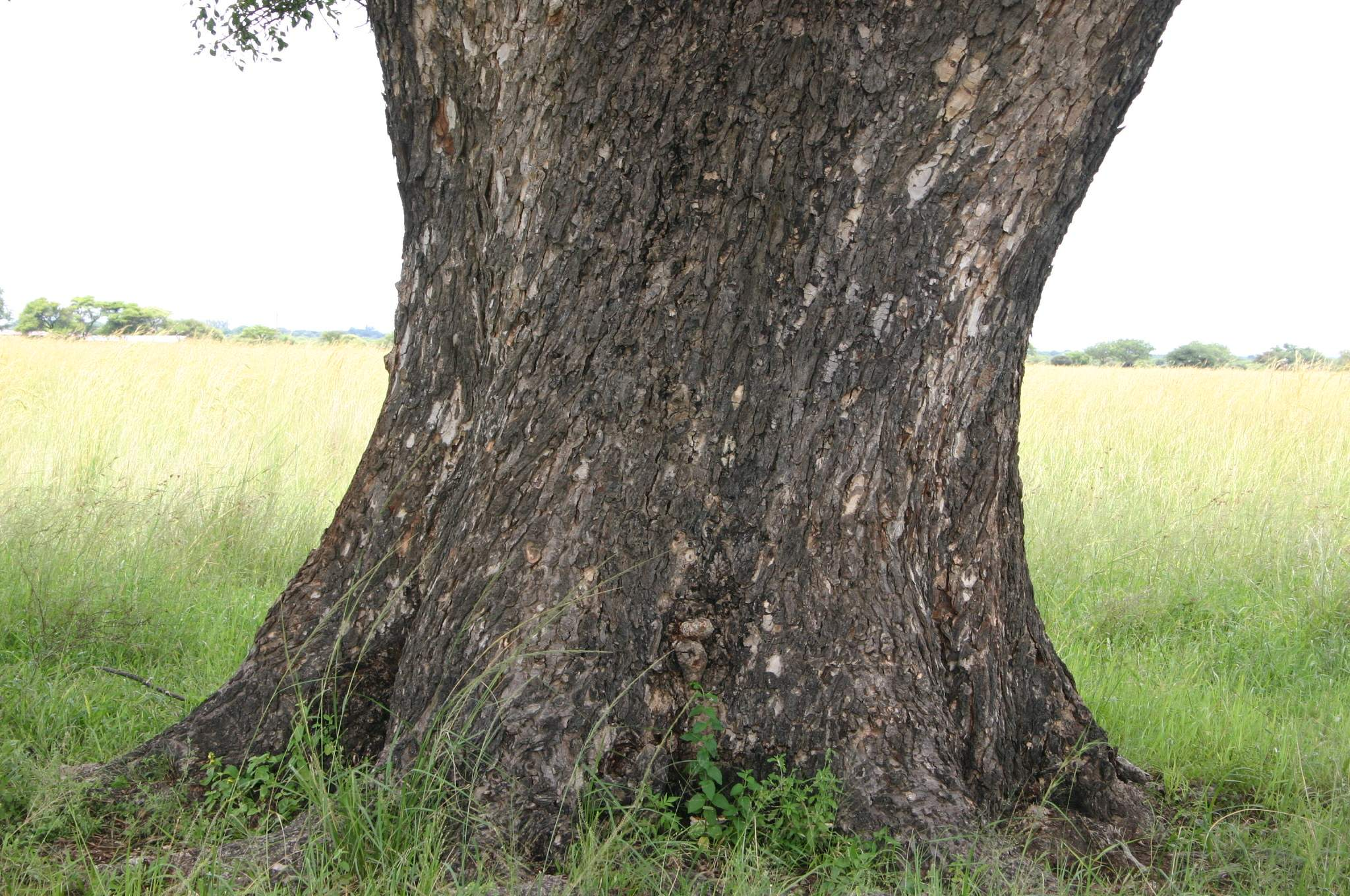
Marula trunk

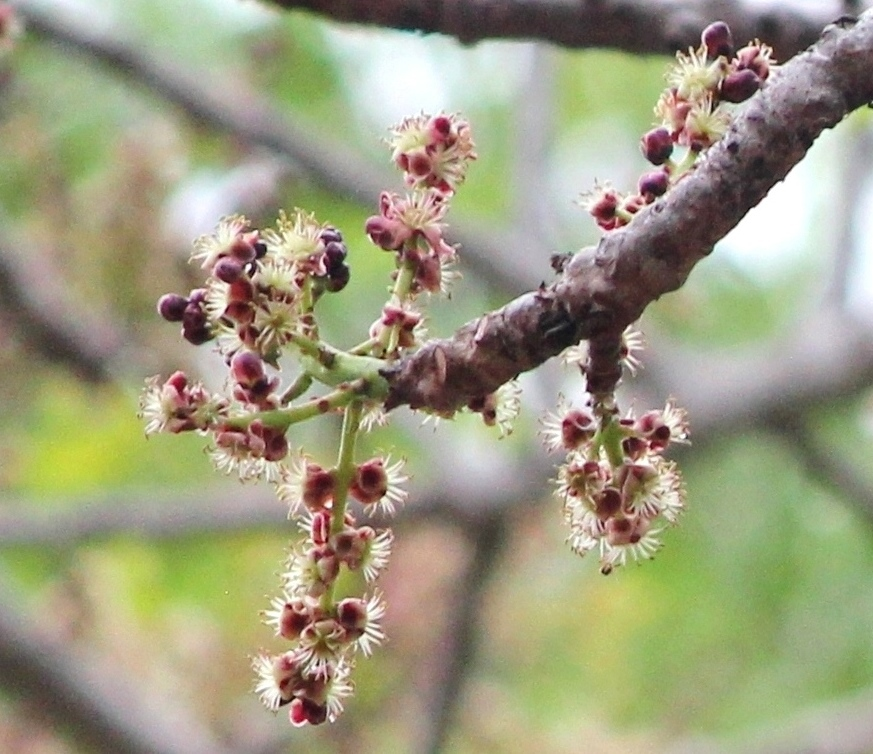
Male flowers

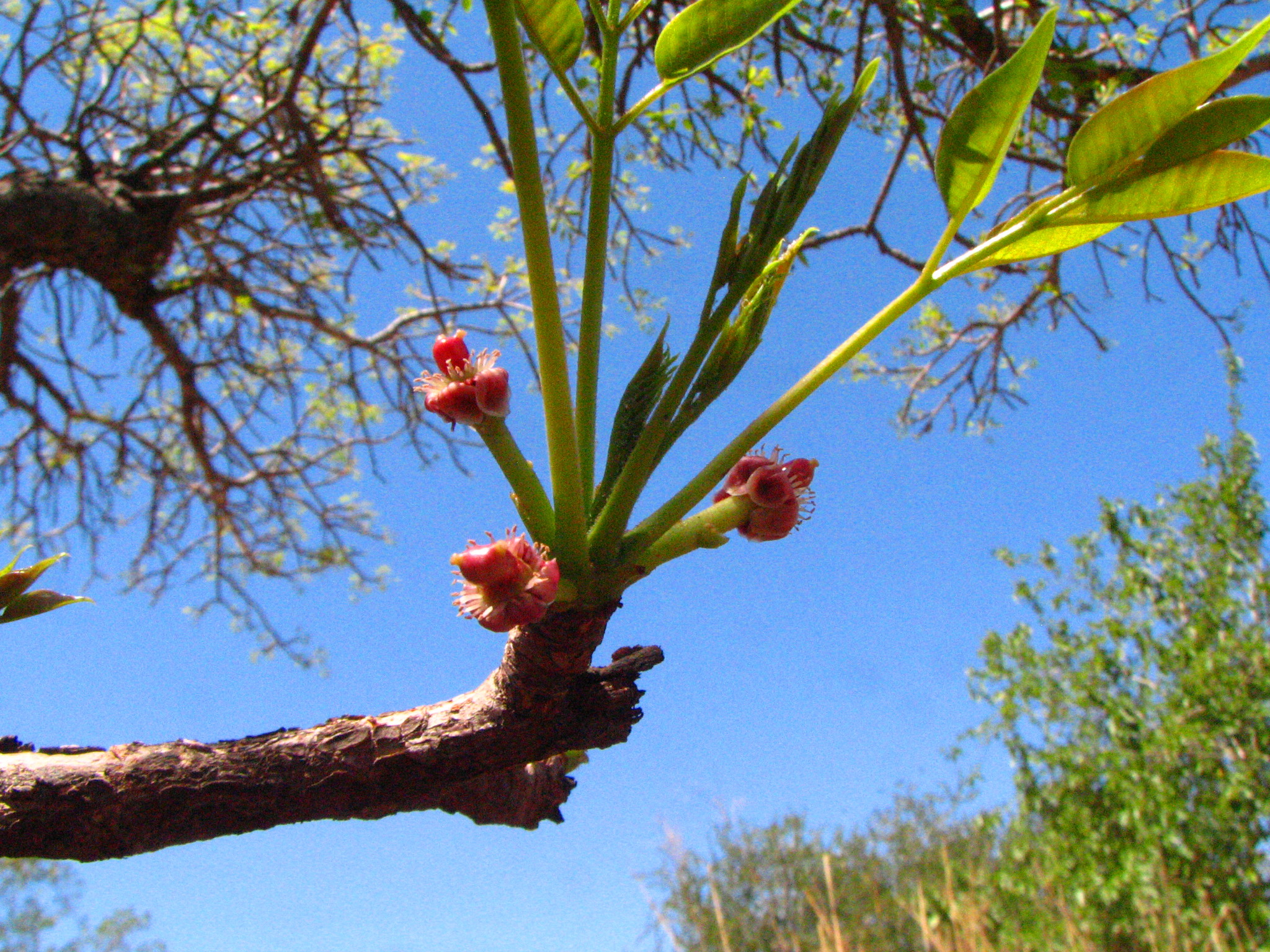
Female flowers

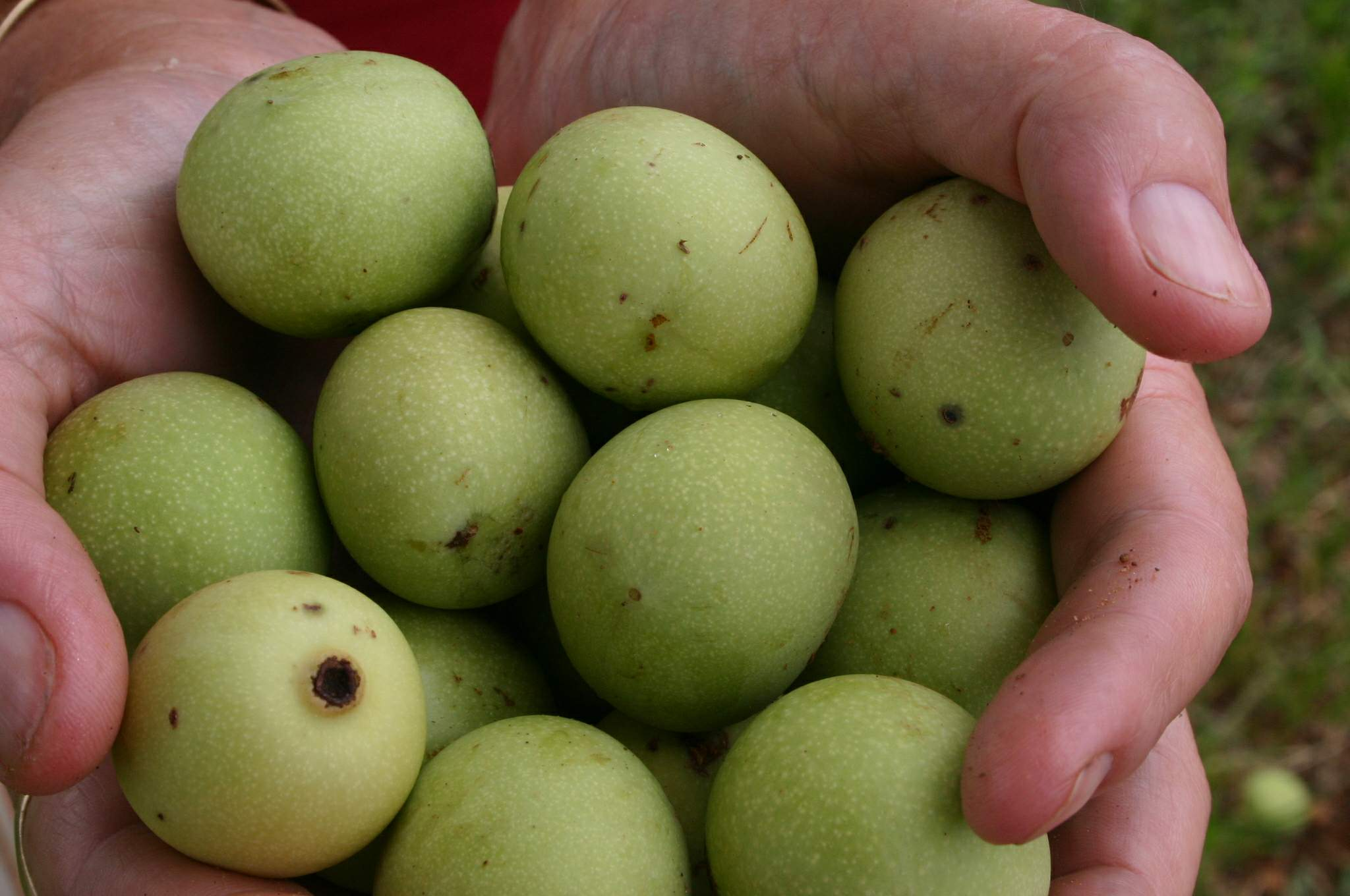
Green marula fruit

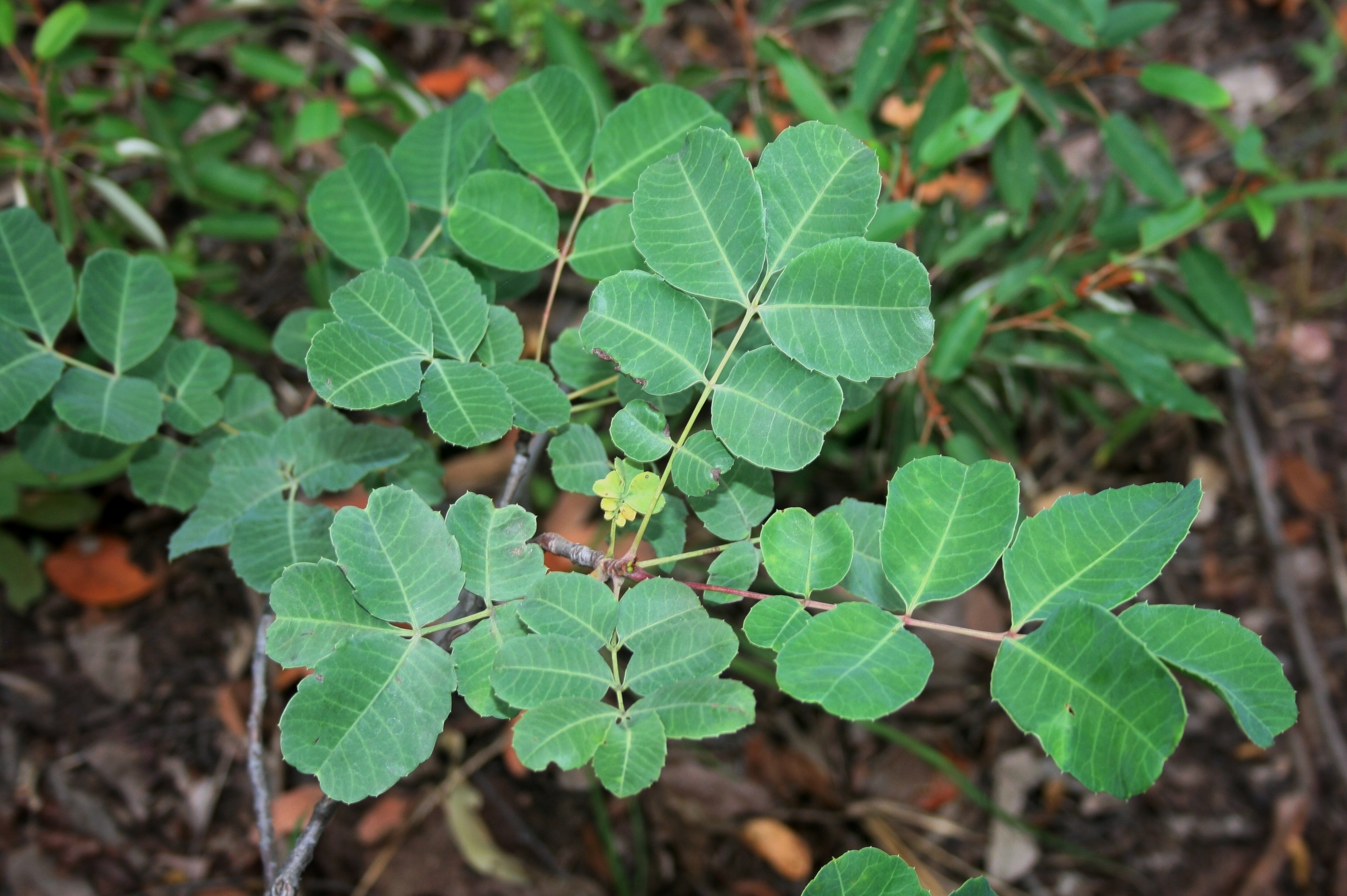
Sapling with distinctive emarginate leaflets with toothed margins, features not present in adult plants

Sclerocarya birrea commonly known as marula, is a medium-sized deciduous fruit-bearing tree, indigenous to the miombo woodlands of Southern Africa, the Sudano-Sahelian range of West Africa, the savanna woodlands of East Africa and Madagascar.

== Etymology ==
The genus Sclerocarya derives from Ancient Greek: σκληρός ⟨sklērós⟩ meaning "hard" and κάρυον ⟨káryon⟩ "nut" in reference to the stone inside the fleshy fruit. The common name marula is borrowed from Tswana (or a closely related language) morula, which refers to the marula tree.

== Description ==
The tree is a single-stemmed species with a broad, spreading crown. It is distinguished by its grey mottled bark and can grow up to 18 metres (59 ft) tall, primarily in low altitudes and open woodlands. The distribution of this species throughout Africa and Madagascar has followed the Bantu in their migrations. There is some evidence of human domestication of marula trees, as trees found on farm lands tend to have larger fruit size.

The fruits are oblong or ovate, about 3–4 centimetres (1.2–1.6 in), rarely attaining 5 centimetres (2.0 in), and ripen between February and March or somewhat later into April; they have a light yellow skin (exocarp), with white flesh (mesocarp). They fall to the ground when unripe and green in colour, and then ripen to a yellow colour on the ground. They are succulent and tart with a strong and distinctive flavour. Inside a hard, thick-walled stone there are usually 2 or 3 seeds, though up to 4 seeds can be present, one in each cell or compartment. The kernel of the seed is edible. The seeds are closed in with plugs. For commercial propagation, the seeds may be soaked or otherwise treated to loosen the plugs (opercula) in order to improve germination.

The trees are dioecious, so that normally only female trees will fruit, but hermaphroditic production has been reported. Male trees produce multiple male flowers on a terminal raceme. These have red sepals and petals, and about 20 stamens per flower. On rare occasions a male flower can produce a gynoecium, turning it bisexual. Female flowers grow individually on their own pedicel and have staminodes.

== Taxonomy and etymology ==
Sclerocarya birrea is divided into three subspecies: subsp. birrea, subsp. afra and subsp. multifoliolata. These subspecies are differentiated by changes in leaf shape and size. Subsp. birrea is found in northern Africa, subsp. afra is found in southern Africa, and subsp. multifoliolata is only found in Tanzania.

The generic name Sclerocarya is derived from the Ancient Greek words 'skleros' meaning 'hard' and 'karyon' meaning 'nut'. This refers to the hard pit of the fruit. The specific epithet 'birrea' comes from the common name 'birr', for this type of tree in Senegal and Gambia. The marula belongs to the same family, Anacardiaceae, as the mango, cashew, pistachio and sumac, and is closely related to the genus Poupartia from Madagascar.

=== Common names ===
Common names include jelly plum, cat thorn, morula, cider tree, marula, maroola nut/plum, or elephant plum.

In South Africa, the Afrikaans names are maroela, olifantsappel. Tribal names (generally Bantu) are mufula in Venda, murula or mufula, etc. in Shona.

In Zimbabwe, it is called mufuna, munganu in the Ndau dialect and umganu, umkano in Northern Ndebele, var. mganu (Note: Language desingation wanting, geography of Matabeleland specified)

In Tanzania, it is known as mn'gongo, mongo, mungango, probably in Swahili.

In Kenya, mngongo in Swahili and Digo language; didissa in Oromo; ol-mangwai in Maasai; oroluo in Pökoot; tololokwo in Tugen.

In Namibia, it is known in the Herero and the closely related Ovambo language as omuongo.

== Subspecies ==
Three subspecies are accepted:

- Sclerocarya birrea subsp. afra (Sond.) Kokwaro – Kenya to Namibia and KwaZulu-Natal, Madagascar, and Mayotte
- Sclerocarya birrea subsp. birrea – West Africa to Ethiopia and Tanzania
- Sclerocarya birrea subsp. multifoliolata (Engl.) Kokwaro – Tanzania

== Uses ==
=== Traditional uses ===
The fruit is traditionally used for food in Africa, and has considerable socioeconomic importance. The fruit juice and pulp are mixed with water and stored in a container over 1–3 days of fermentation to make marula beer, a traditional alcoholic beverage.

The edible kernel inside the hard nutshell is difficult to extract but is still eaten; these "nuts" are a staple that some hunter-gatherer tribes subsist on in the winter season.

In Namibia, the Ovambo people call the liqueur or wine made from marula omagongo or omaongo, (Note: The medial g is softened to h, hence the phonetic transcription "aw-mah-horn-gaw", or even silenced, hence the alternate spelling "omaongo".) perhaps distinguishable from a weaker beer product. (Note: Though other sources gloss omagongo as "marula beer".) The juice (Kuanyama: oshinwa) and cooking oil (odjove (Note: Or omaadi eengongo.)) are also harvested.

Marula oil is used topically to moisturise the skin, and also an edible oil in the diet of San people in Southern Africa. The marula tree is protected in South Africa.

In South Africa, the Amarula cream liqueur is made from the fruit. There are also mampoer (moonshine) distilled from the marula, which is mentioned in the writings of South African writer Herman Charles Bosman. (Note: In the short story "Mampoer", a comparison is made that the "brandy" made from karee（Searsia lancea, Afican sumac) is weaker compared to the distillates of moepel（Searsia lancea, Transvaal red milkwood) or the marula (Afrikaans: maroela).)

=== Commercial uses ===
On an industrial level the fruit of the marula tree is collected from the wild by members of rural communities on whose land the trees grow. This harvest and sale of fruit only occur over two to three months, but is an important source of income to poor rural people, especially women.

=== Uses by other species ===
The marula fruit is eaten by various animals in Southern Africa. Giraffes, rhinoceroses and elephants all browse on the marula tree, with elephants in particular being a major consumer. Elephants eat the bark, branches and fruits of the marula, which may limit the spread of the trees. The damaged bark, due to browsing, can be used to identify marula trees as elephants preferentially target them. Elephants distribute marula seeds in their dung. In the documentary Animals Are Beautiful People by Jamie Uys, released in 1974, some scenes portray elephants, ostriches, warthogs and baboons allegedly becoming intoxicated from eating fermented marula fruit, as do reports in the popular press. While the fruit is commonly eaten by elephants, the animals would need a huge amount of fermented marulas to have any effect on them.

The marula fruit has been suggested to be the food of choice for the ancestral forest-dwelling form of the fruit fly Drosophila melanogaster, which was much more selective about which fruit they preferred than the flies that have self-domesticated to live near to humans. The ancestral fruit flies are triggered by the ester ethyl isovalerate in the marula fruit.

== Gallery ==
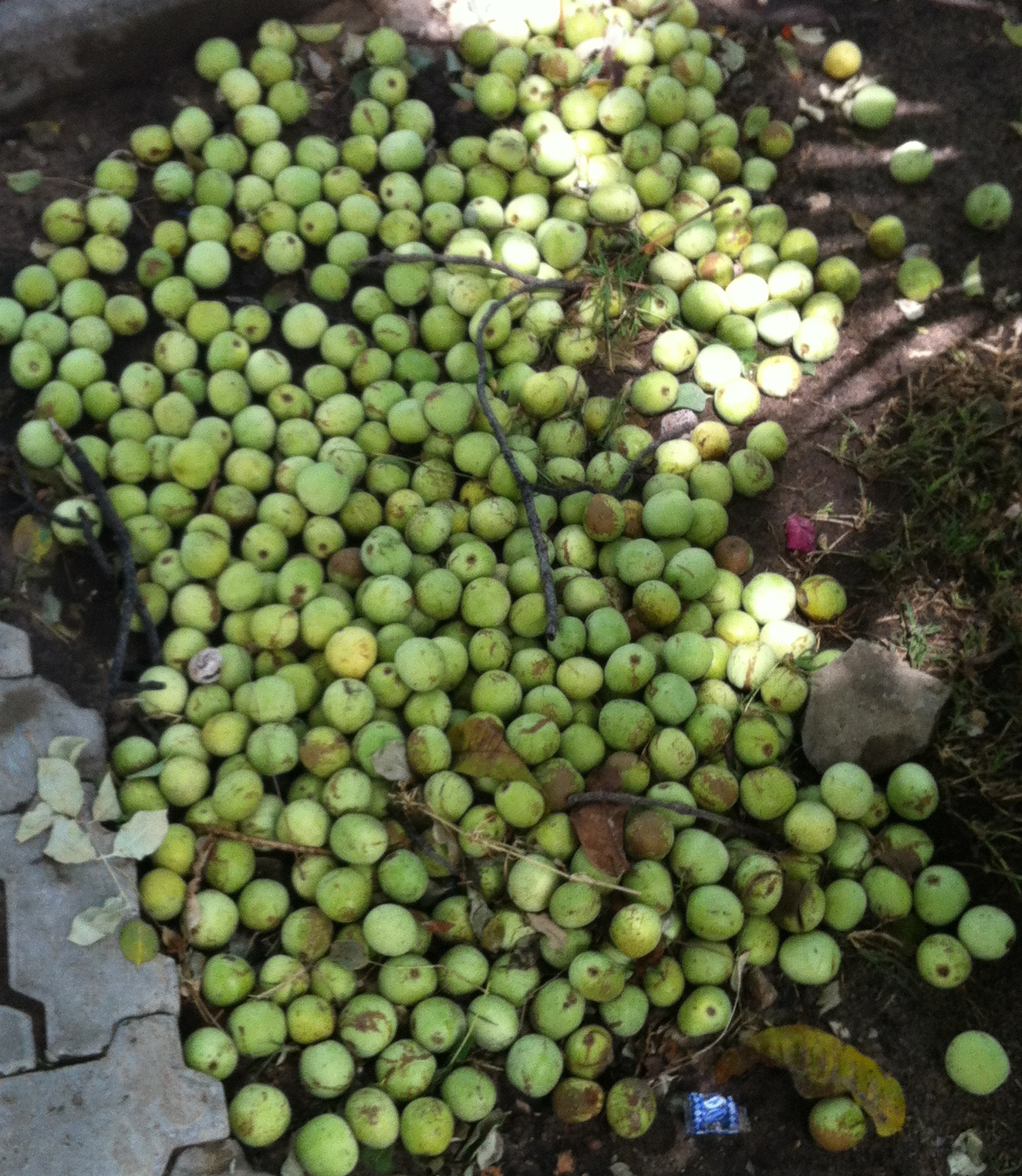
Marula windfalls in Ongwediva, Namibia

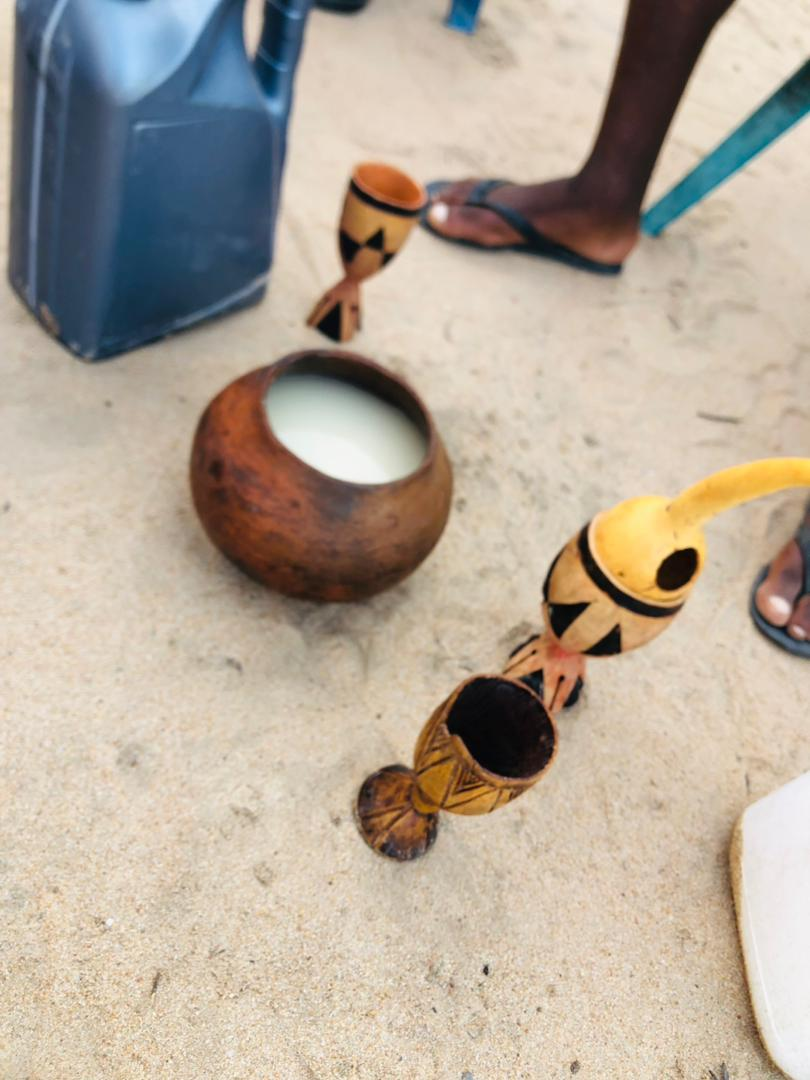
Marula cider, Ongwediva, Namibia

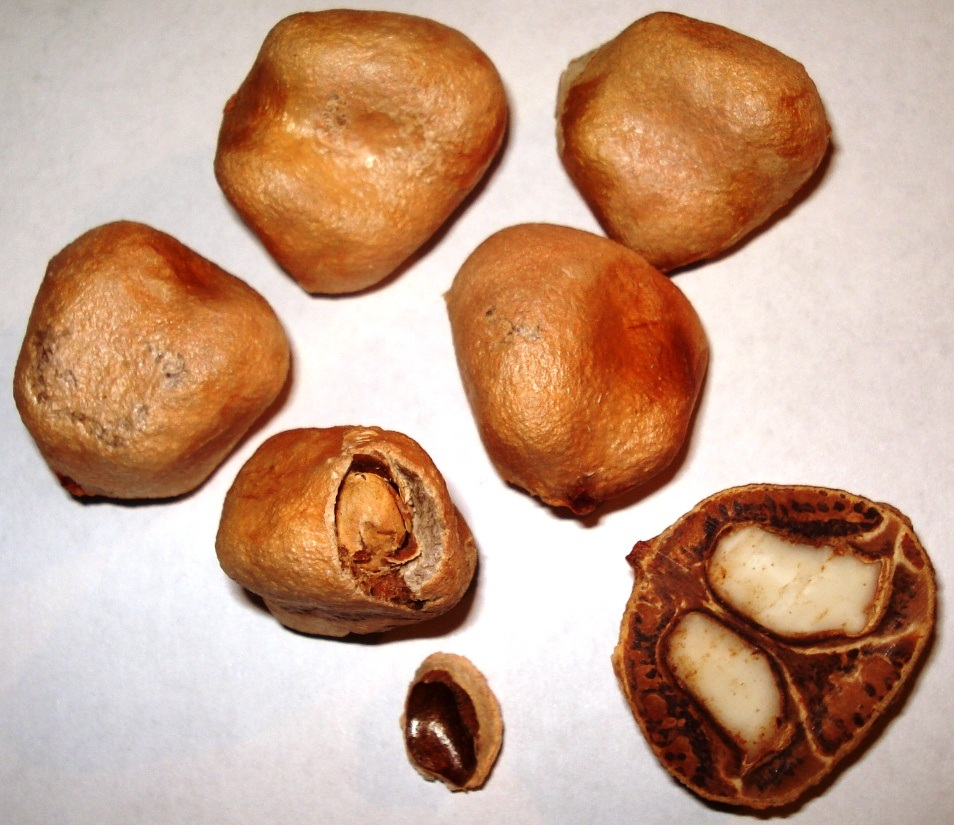
Marula stones

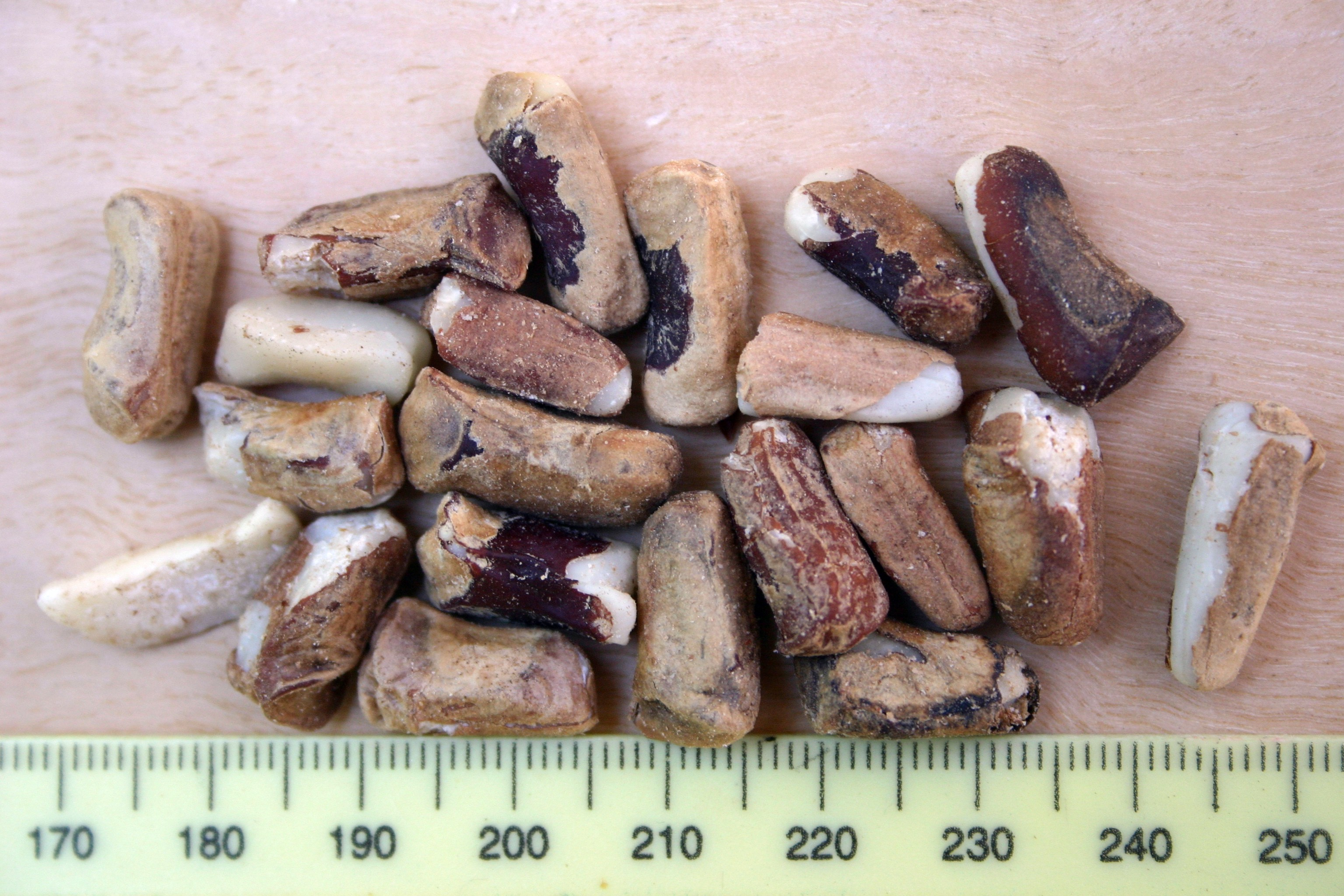
Marula seeds

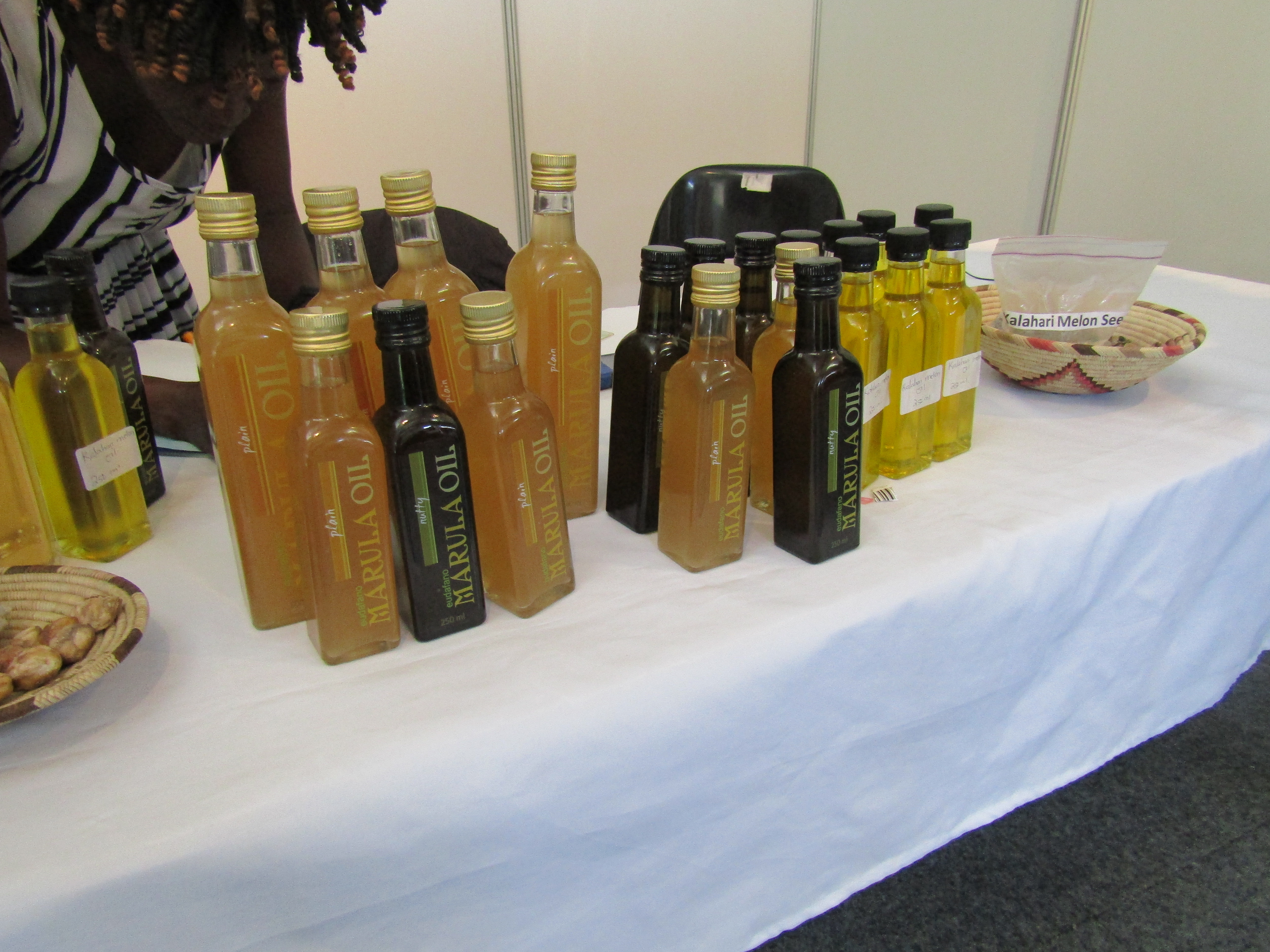
Marula oil for sale at Ongwediva Annual Trade Fair 2016, Namibia
