= Zoopharmacognosy =

Self-medication by animals

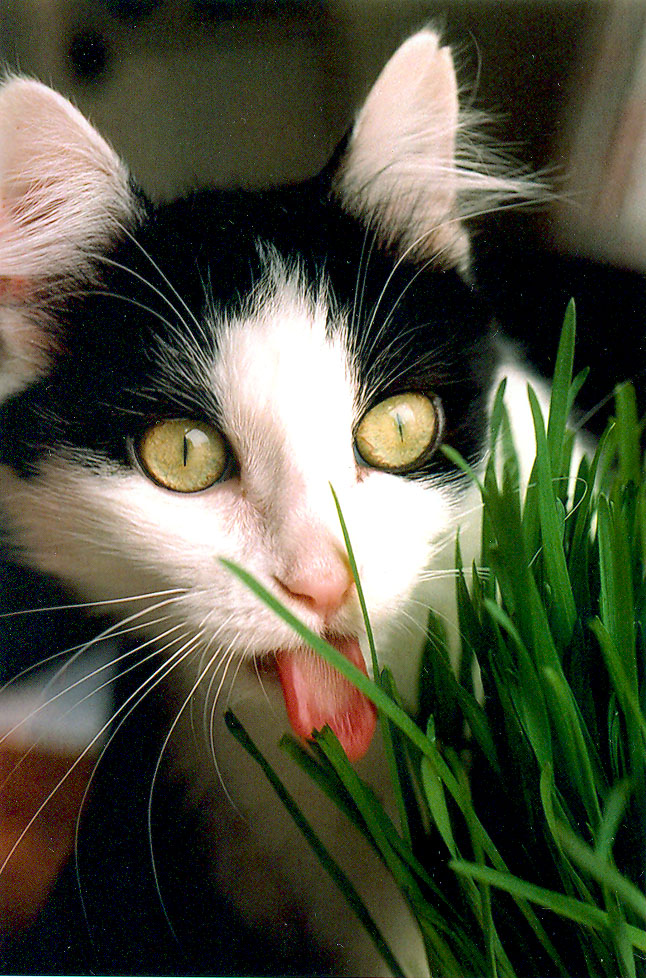
A cat eating grass – an example of zoopharmacognosy

Zoopharmacognosy is a behaviour in which non-human animals self-medicate by selecting and ingesting or topically applying plants, soils and insects with medicinal properties, to prevent or reduce the harmful effects of pathogens, toxins, and even other animals. The term derives from Greek words zoon ("animal"), pharmacon ("drug, medicine"), and gnosis ("knowledge").

An example of zoopharmacognosy occurs when dogs eat grass to induce vomiting. However, the behaviour is more diverse than this. Animals ingest or apply non-foods such as clay, charcoal and even toxic plants and invertebrates, apparently to prevent parasitic infestation or poisoning.

Whether animals truly self-medicate remains a somewhat controversial subject because early evidence is mostly circumstantial or anecdotal. However, more recent examinations have adopted an experimental, hypothesis-driven approach.

The methods by which animals self-medicate vary, but can be classified according to function as prophylactic (preventative, before infection or poisoning) or therapeutic (after infection, to combat the pathogen or poisoning). The behaviour is believed to have widespread adaptive significance.

== History and etymology ==
In 1978, Janzen suggested that vertebrate herbivores might benefit medicinally from the secondary metabolites in their plant food.

In 1987, the term "zoopharmacognosy" was coined, derived from the Greek roots zoo ("animal"), pharma ("drug"), and gnosy ("knowing"). The term gained popularity from academic works and in a book by Cindy Engel entitled Wild Health: How Animals Keep Themselves Well and What We Can Learn from Them.

== Mechanisms ==
The three reported methods of self-medication are deglutition, ingestion, and topical application. When using one of these methods while appearing well, an animal may be using self-medication as a prophylactic measure. When it is unwell, the animal could be using self-medication as a curative measure.

Ingested material may have pharmacological antiparasitic properties, such as phytochemicals decreasing the ability of worms to attach to the mucosal lining of the intestines or chemotaxis attracting worms into the folds of leaves. Additionally, many plants have trichomes, often presented as hooked and spiky hairs, that can attach to parasites and dislodge them from the intestines. Another possible mode of action is that the ingested material may initiate a purging response of the gastrointestinal tract by rapidly inducing diarrhoea. This substantially decreases gut transit time, causing worm expulsion and interruption in the life cycle of parasites. This, or a similar, mechanism could explain undigested materials in the faeces of various animals such as birds, carnivores and primates.

Some animals apply substances with medicinal properties to their skin in a process known as topical application, which is often used by animals to treat wounds or repel insects. In some cases, this is known as self-anointing. When plant leaves are chewed and then directly rubbed onto fur, compounds from said leaves are released for use. These compounds can often be analgesic or antiparasitic in nature. In regards to an insect repellant, the secondary metabolites traditionally used by plants to deter herbivores and insects from eating them can be used by animals as a protective measure. By interfering with neuroreceptors, these secondary metabolites can specifically act as olfactory cues for insects to avoid a certain source.

== Examples ==
=== Apes ===
Great apes often consume plants that have no nutritional values but which have beneficial effects on gut acidity or combat intestinal parasitic infection.

Chimpanzees, bonobos, and gorillas eat the fruits of Aframomum angustifolium. Laboratory assays of homogenized fruit and seed extracts show significant anti-microbial activity. Illustrating the medicinal knowledge of some species, apes have been observed selecting a particular part of a medicinal plant by taking off leaves and breaking the stem to suck out the juice.

Chimpanzees sometimes select bitter leaves for chewing. Parasite infection drops noticeably after chimpanzees chew leaves of pith (Vernonia amygdalina), which contain sesquiterpene lactones and steroid glucosides that are particularly effective against schistosoma, plasmodium and Leishmania. Specifically, these compounds can induce paralysis within the parasites and impair its ability to absorb nutrients, move, and reproduce. Chimpanzees do not consume bitter on a regular basis, but when they do, it is often in small amounts by individuals that appear ill. Jane Goodall witnessed chimpanzees eating particular bushes, apparently to make themselves vomit.

Wild chimpanzees sometimes seek leaves of the Aspilia plant. These contain thiarubrine-A, a chemical active against intestinal nematode parasites. Because this compound is quickly broken down by the stomach, chimpanzees will pick up the Aspilia leaves and, rather than chewing them, they roll them around in their mouths, sometimes for as long as 25 seconds. They then swallow the capsule-like leaves whole. Afterwards, the trichomes of the leaves can attach to any intestinal parasites, namely the nodular worm (Oesophagostomum stephanostomum) and tapeworm (Bertiella studeri), and allow the chimpanzee to physically expel the parasites. As many as 15 to 35 Aspilia leaves may be used in each bout of this behaviour, particularly in the rainy season when there is an abundance of many parasitic larvae that can cause an increased risk of infection.

Chimpanzees sometimes eat the leaves of the herbaceous Desmodium gangeticum. Undigested, non-chewed leaves were recovered in 4% of faecal samples of wild chimpanzees and clumps of sharp-edged grass leaves in 2%. The leaves have a rough surface or sharp-edges and the fact they were not chewed and excreted whole indicates they were not ingested for nutritional purposes. Furthermore, this leaf-swallowing was restricted to the rainy season when parasite re-infections are more common, and parasitic worms (Oesophagostomum stephanostomum) were found together with the leaves.

A 2022 study reported that chimpanzees crushed and applied insects to their own wounds and the wounds of other chimpanzees.

Bonobos sometimes swallow non-chewed stem-strips of Manniophyton fulvum. Despite the plant being abundantly available all year, M. fulvum is ingested only at specific times, in small amounts, and by a small proportion of bonobos in each group, demonstrating that it is indeed only utilized when the bonobos are unwell.

A male Sumatran orangutan known to researchers as Rakus "appeared to have used the plant intentionally" when he chewed up leaves of the "antibacterial, anti-inflammatory, anti-fungal, antioxidant, pain-killing and anticarcinogenic" vine Fibraurea tinctoria and applied the masticated plant material to an open wound on his face. According to primatologists who had been observing Rakus at a nature preserve, "Five days later the facial wound was closed, while within a few weeks it had healed, leaving only a small scar".

=== Monkeys ===
Tamarins were observed swallowing the large seeds of the fruit they regularly ingest. Although they are consumed along with the rest of the fruit, these seeds have no nutritional value for the monkeys. Since tamarins are routinely infected by trematodes, cestodes, nematodes, and acanthocephalans, there is speculation that the deliberate swallowing of these large seeds can help dislodge the parasites from the monkey's body.

Tufted capuchins (Cebus apella) rub various parts of their body with carpenter ants (Camponotus rufipes) or allow the ants to crawl over them, in a behaviour called anting. The capuchins often combine anting with urinating into their hands and mixing the ants with the urine. A female capuchin monkey in captivity was observed using tools covered in a sugar-based syrup to groom her wounds and those of her infant.

A range of primates rub millipedes onto their fur and skin; millipedes contain benzoquinones, compounds known to be potently repellent to insects. As the millipede secretions are also psychoactive, the behavior may also be a form of recreational drug use in animals.

Callicebus oenanthes have been observed rubbing leaves of Piper aduncum on their furs and abdominal areas. Since these leaves contain insecticides like dillapiole and phenylpropanoids, it is speculated that this fur-rubbing is an indication of a preventative measure to ward off insects. Additionally, another species of titi monkeys, Plecturocebus cupreus, were seen rubbing their furs with the leaves of Psychotria, whose compounds have antiviral, antifungal, and analgesic properties.

Anubis baboons (Papio anubis) and hamadryas baboons (Papio hamadryas) in Ethiopia use fruits and leaves of Balanites aegyptiaca to control schistosomiasis. Its fruits contain diosgenin, a hormone precursor that presumably hinders the development of schistosomes.

=== Bears ===
Similar to the wild chimpanzees, Alaskan brown bears will swallow whole Carex leaves in the springtime to ensure the complete expulsion of parasites during their hibernation. Specifically, as tapeworms thrive off previously digested nutrients in the gut, the rough Carex leaves will lacerate their scolices, facilitating the defecation process. The proactive swallowing of these leaves will ensure low levels of active parasites within a hibernating bear.

North American brown bears (Ursos arctos) make a paste of Osha roots (Ligusticum porteri) and saliva and rub it through their fur to repel insects or soothe bites. This plant, locally known as "bear root", contains 105 active compounds, such as coumarins that may repel insects when topically applied. Navajo Indians are said to have learned to use this root medicinally from the bear for treating stomach aches and infections.

=== Other Mammals ===
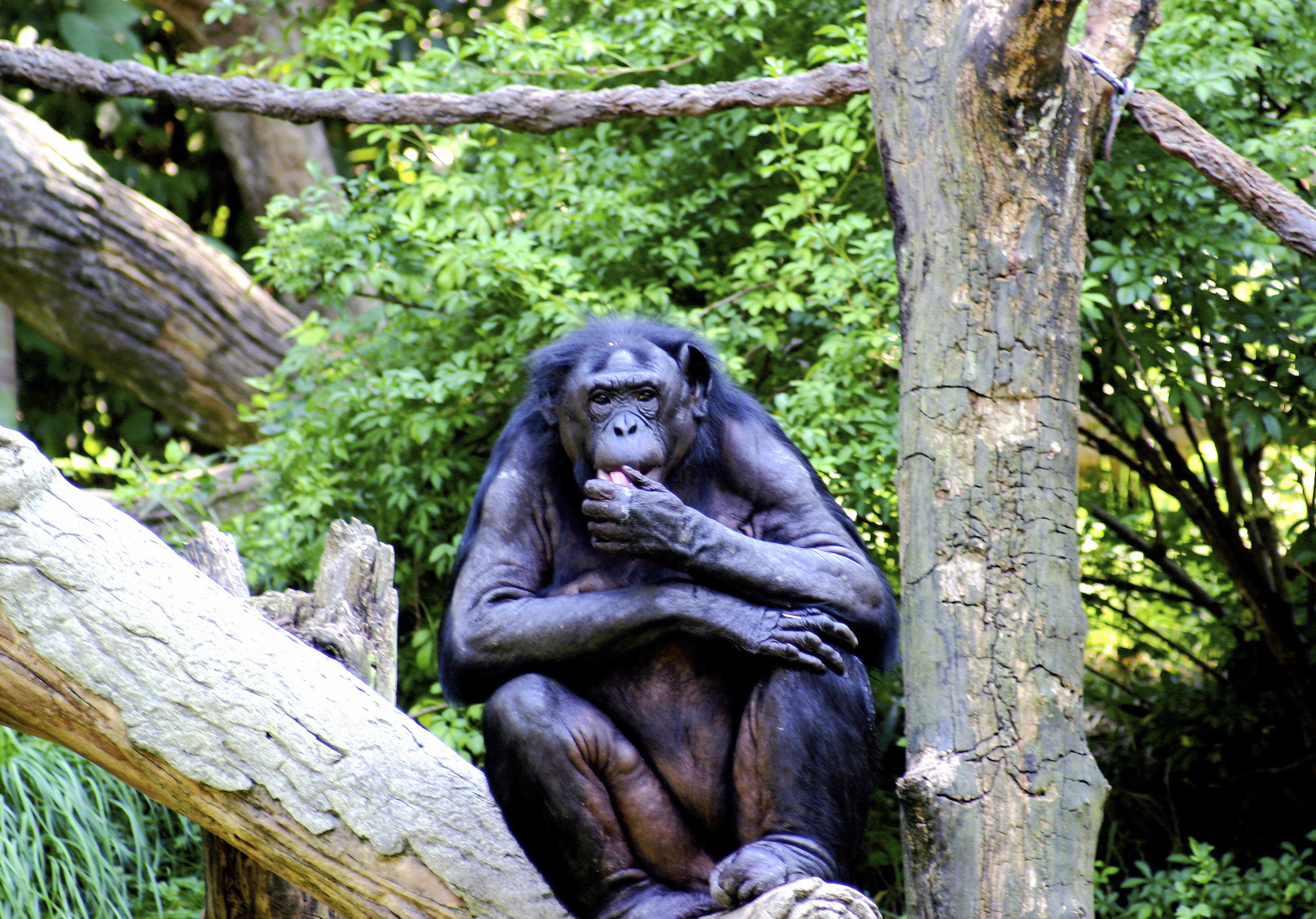
A variety of simian species have been observed to medicate themselves when ill using materials such as plants.

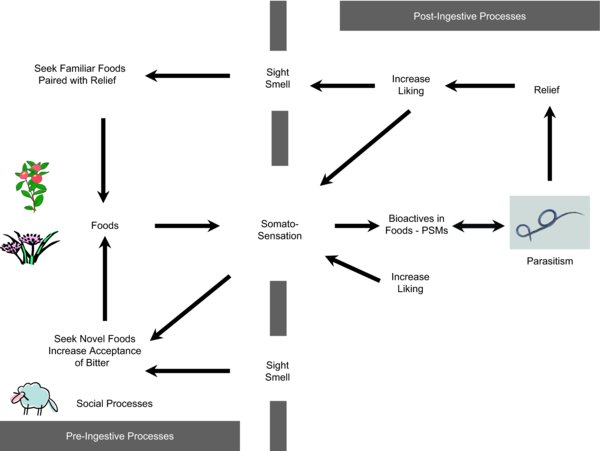
A conceptual representation of how pre- and post-ingestive events control the manifestation of self-medicative behavior in mammalian herbivores

Indo-Pacific bottlenose dolphins have been observed to swim near and rub themselves against specific types of corals and sponges. A team of scientists followed up on this behavior and discovered metabolites with antibacterial, antioxidative, and hormonal activities in the corals and sponges, suggesting that they might be used by the dolphins to treat skin infections.

African elephants (Loxodonta africana) apparently self-medicate to induce labour by chewing on the leaves of a particular tree from the family Boraginaceae; Kenyan women brew a tea from this tree for the same purpose.

White-nosed coatis (Nasua narica) in Panama take the menthol-scented resin from freshly scraped bark of Trattinnickia aspera (Burseraceae) and vigorously rub it into their own fur or that of other coatis, possibly to kill ectoparasites such as fleas, ticks, and lice, as well as biting insects such as mosquitoes; the resin contains triterpenes α- and β-amyrin, the eudesmane derivative β-selinene, and the sesquiterpene lactone 8β-hydroxyasterolide.

Domestic cats and dogs often select and ingest plant material either to induce vomiting or for anti-parasitic purposes.

Indian wild boars selectively dig up and eat the roots of pigweed which humans use as an anthelmintic. Mexican folklore indicates that pigs eat pomegranate roots because they contain an alkaloid that is toxic to tapeworms.

A study on domestic sheep (Ovis aries) has provided clear experimental proof of self-medication via individual learning. Lambs in a treatment group were allowed to consume foods and toxins (grain, tannins, oxalic acid) that lead to malaise (negative internal states) and then allowed to eat a substance known to alleviate each malaise (sodium bentonite, polyethylene glycol and dicalcium phosphate, respectively). Control lambs ate the same foods and medicines, but this was disassociated temporally so they did not recuperate from the illness. After the conditioning, lambs were fed grain or food with tannins or oxalates and then allowed to choose the three medicines. The treatment animals preferred to eat the specific compound known to rectify the state of malaise induced by the food previously ingested. However, control animals did not change their pattern of use of the medicines, irrespective of the food consumed before the choice. Other ruminants learn to self-medicate against gastrointestinal parasites by increasing consumption of plant secondary compounds with antiparasitic actions.

Standard laboratory cages prevent mice from performing several natural behaviours for which they are highly motivated. As a consequence, laboratory mice sometimes develop abnormal behaviours indicative of emotional disorders such as depression and anxiety. To improve welfare, these cages are sometimes enriched with items such as nesting material, shelters and running wheels. Sherwin and Olsson tested whether such enrichment influenced the consumption of Midazolam, a drug widely used to treat anxiety in humans. Mice in standard cages, standard cages but with unpredictable husbandry, or enriched cages, were given a choice of drinking either non-drugged water or a solution of the Midazolam. Mice in the standard and unpredictable cages drank a greater proportion of the anxiolytic solution than mice from enriched cages, presumably because they had been experiencing greater anxiety. Early studies indicated that autoimmune (MRL/lpr) mice readily consume solutions with cyclophosphamide, an immunosuppressive drug that prevents inflammatory damage to internal organs. However, further studies provided contradictory evidence.

During the cold and rainy seasons, the crested porcupines (Hystrix cristata) in Central Italy tend to become infected by seven different species of ectoparasites and seven different species of endoparasites. During this time, it is observed that these porcupine populations actively sought out a rather large variety of medicinal plants, mostly with antiparasitic properties, to consume. When ingested, these plants appeared to be relieving the symptoms of the infections, such as inflammation.

=== Birds ===
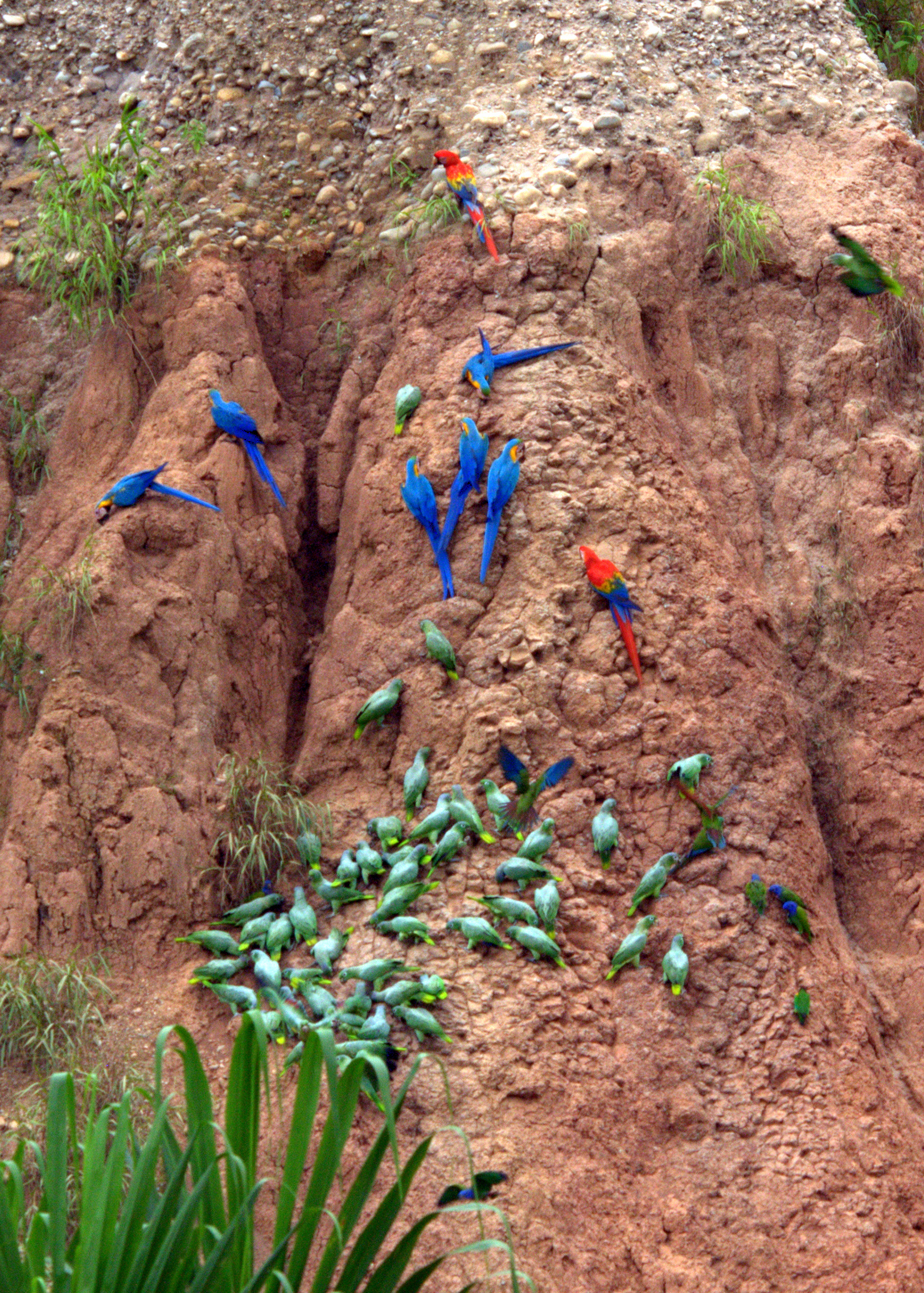
A group of various species of parrot, including blue-and-yellow, scarlet and chestnut-fronted macaws, mealy amazons, blue-headed parrots and an orange-cheeked parrot consuming clay in the Tambopata National Reserve, Peru

Many parrot species in the Americas, Africa, and Papua New Guinea consume kaolin or clay, which both releases minerals and absorbs toxic compounds from the gut.

Great bustards eat blister beetles of the genus Meloe maybe to decrease parasite load in the digestive system; cantharidin, the toxic compound in blister beetles, can kill a great bustard if too many beetles are ingested. Great bustards may eat toxic blister beetles of the genus Meloe to increase the sexual arousal of males. Some plants selected in the mating season showed in-vitro activity against laboratory models of parasites and pathogens.

More than 200 species of song birds rub insects, usually ants, on their feathers and skin, a behaviour known as anting. Birds either grasp ants in their bill and wipe them vigorously along the spine of each feather down to the base, or sometimes roll in ant hills twisting and turning so the ants crawl through their feathers. Birds most commonly use ants that spray formic acid. In laboratory tests, this acid is harmful to feather lice. Its vapour alone can kill them.

Some birds select nesting material rich in anti-microbial agents that may protect themselves and their young from harmful infestations or infections. European starlings (Sturnus vulgaris) preferentially select and line their nests with wild carrot (Daucus carota); chicks from nests lined with this have greater levels of haemoglobin compared to those from nests which are not, although there is no difference in the weight or feather development of the chicks. Laboratory studies show that wild carrot substantially reduces the emergence of the instars of mites. House sparrows (Passer domesticus) have been observed to line their nests with materials from the neem tree (Azadirachta indica) but change to quinine-rich leaves of the Krishnachua tree (Caesalpinia pulcherrima) during an outbreak of malaria; quinine controls the symptoms of malaria.

=== Invertebrates ===
Woolly bear caterpillars (Grammia incorrupta) are sometimes lethally endoparasitised by tachinid flies. The caterpillars ingest plant toxins called pyrrolizidine alkaloids, which improve survival by conferring resistance against the flies. Crucially, parasitised caterpillars are more likely than non-parasitised caterpillars to specifically ingest large amounts of pyrrolizidine alkaloids, and excessive ingestion of these toxins reduces the survival of non-parasitised caterpillars. These three findings are all consistent with the adaptive plasticity theory.

The tobacco hornworm ingests nicotine which reduces colony growth and toxicity of Bacillus thuringiensis, leading to increased survival of the hornworm.

Ants infected with Beauveria bassiana, a fungus, selectively consume harmful substances (reactive oxygen species, ROS) upon exposure to a fungal pathogen, yet avoid these in the absence of infection.

== Geophagy ==
Many animals eat soil or clay, a behaviour known as geophagy. Kaolin is the primary ingredient of clay. For primates, four hypotheses have been proposed relating to geophagy in alleviating gastrointestinal disorders or upsets:

1. soils adsorb toxins such as phenolics and secondary metabolites
2. soil ingestion has an antacid action and adjusts the gut pH
3. soils act as an antidiarrhoeal agent
4. soils counteract the effects of endoparasites.

Furthermore, two hypotheses pertain to geophagy in supplementing minerals and elements:

5. soils supplement nutrient-poor diets
6. soils provide extra iron at high altitudes

Tapirs, forest elephants, colobus monkeys, mountain gorillas and chimpanzees seek out and eat clay, which absorbs intestinal bacteria and their toxins and alleviates stomach upset and diarrhoea. Cattle eat clay-rich termite mound soil, which deactivates ingested pathogens or fruit toxins.

== Social zoopharmacognosy ==
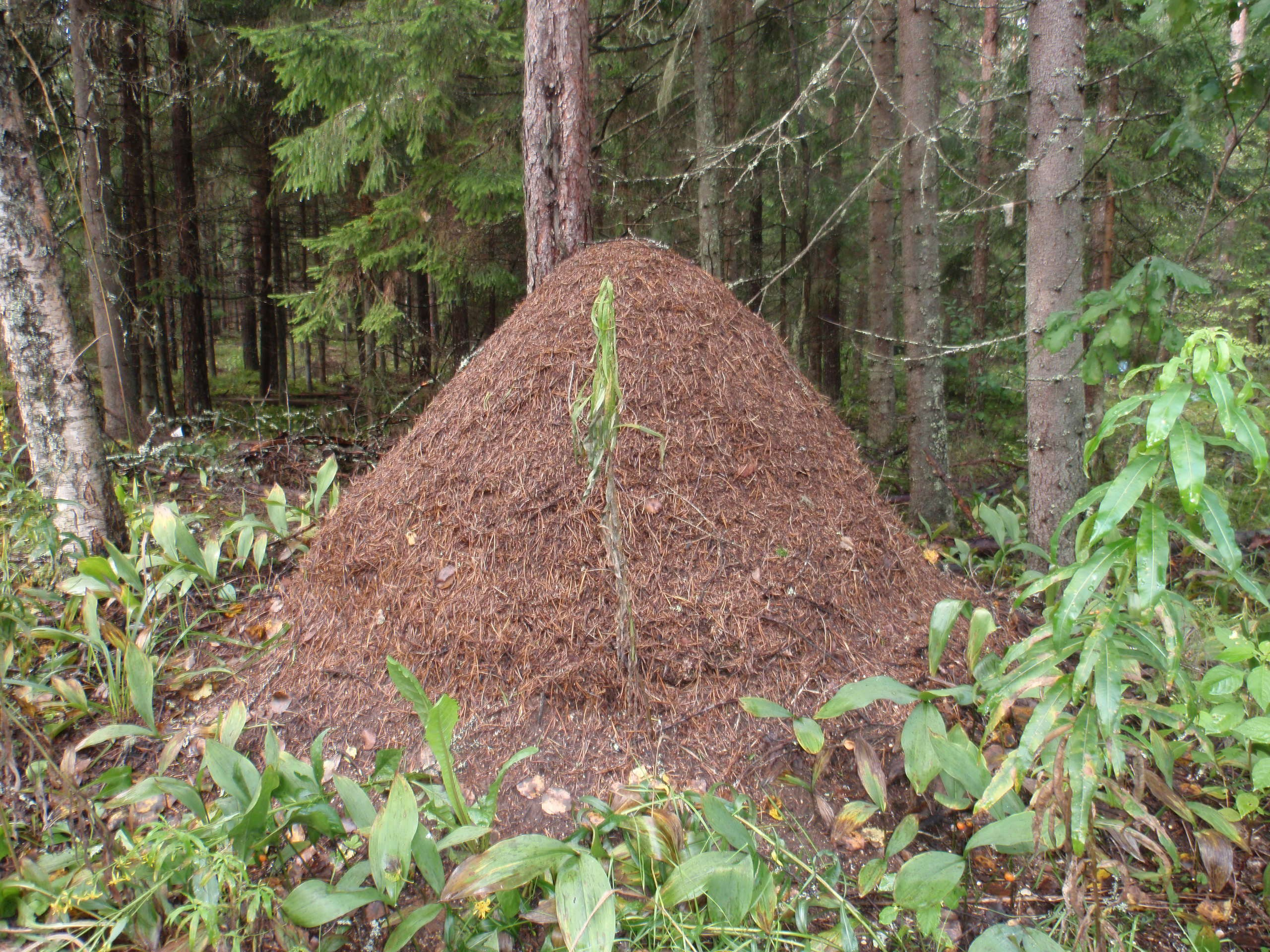
Wood ants incorporate resin into their nest to inhibit the growth of microorganisms.

Zoopharmacognosy is not always exhibited in a way that benefits the individual. Sometimes the target of the medication is the group or the colony.

Wood ants (Formica paralugubris) often incorporate large quantities of solidified conifer resin into their nests. Laboratory studies have shown this resin inhibits the growth of bacteria and fungi in a context mimicking natural conditions. The ants show a strong preference for resin over twigs and stones, which are building materials commonly available in their environment. There is seasonal variation in the foraging of ants: the preference for resin over twigs is more pronounced in spring than in summer, whereas in autumn the ants collect twigs and resin at equal rates. The relative collection rate of resin versus stones does not depend on infection with the entomopathogenic fungus Metarhizium anisopliae in laboratory conditions, indicating the resin collection is prophylactic rather than therapeutic.

Honey bees also incorporate plant-produced resins into their nest architecture, which can reduce chronic elevation of an individual bee's immune response. When colonies of honey bees are challenged with the fungal parasite (Ascophaera apis), the bees increase their resin foraging. Additionally, colonies experimentally enriched with resin have decreased infection intensities of the fungus.

== Transgenerational zoopharmacognosy ==
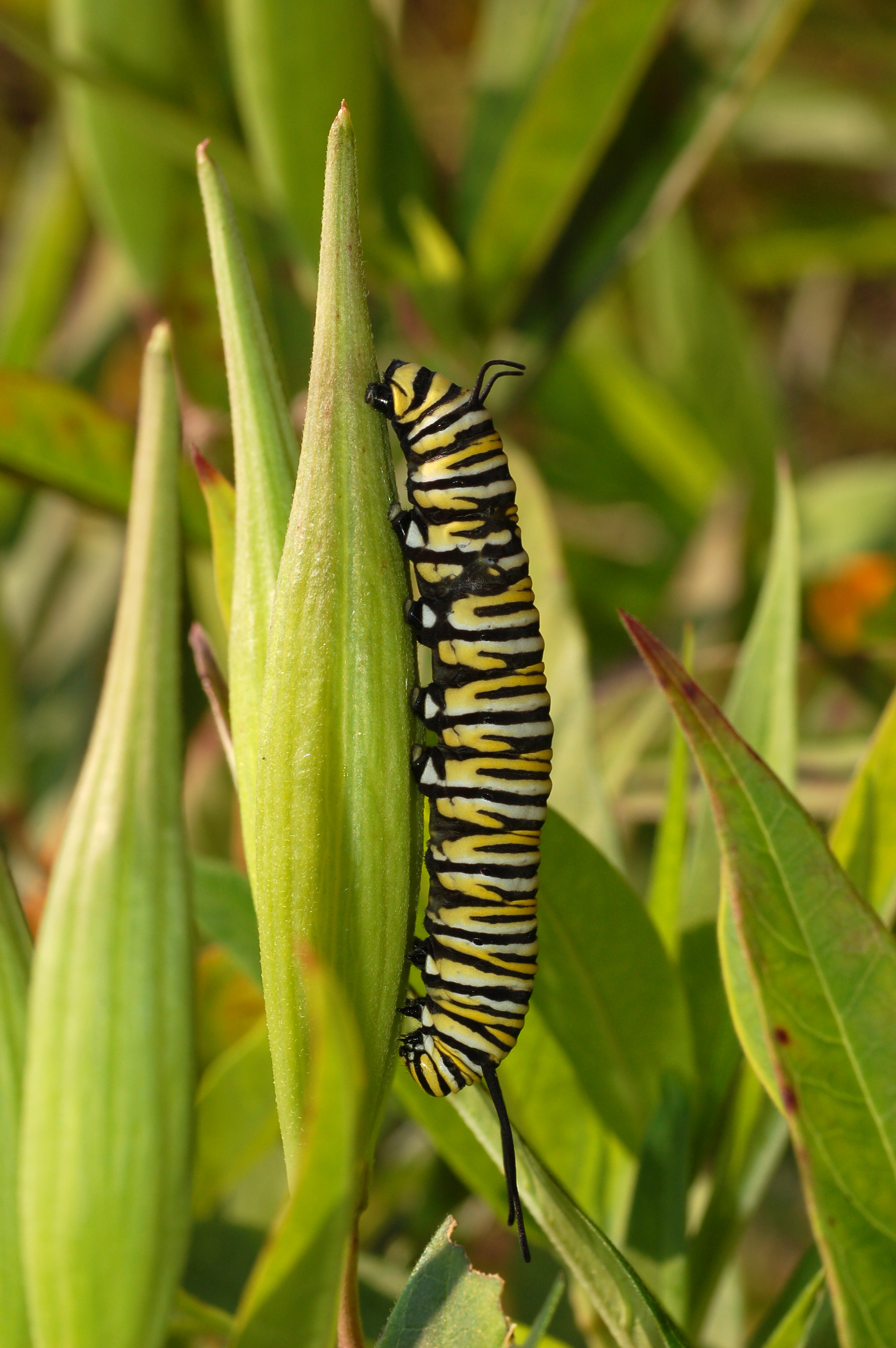
Adult monarch butterflies lay their eggs on toxic plants to reduce parasite growth and disease in their offspring.

Zoopharmacognosy can be classified depending on the target of the medication. Some animals lay their eggs in such a way that their offspring are the target of the medication.

Adult monarch butterflies preferentially lay their eggs on toxic plants such as milkweed which reduce parasite growth and disease in their offspring caterpillars. This has been termed transgenerational therapeutic medication.

When detecting endoparasitoid wasps, fruit flies (Drosophila melanogaster) lay their eggs in leaves with high ethanol content as a means of protection for their offspring. These wasps, especially those of the Leptopilina genus, will inject their eggs in approximately 80% of fruit fly larvae. As these wasp eggs develop, they will consume extensively through the larvae. To combat this, the fruit fly larvae will consume a large amount of ethanol from the food source to medicate themselves after wasp infection. Specifically, as the wasps are consuming more of the larvae, they will unknowingly consume more ethanol, which promptly leads to their deaths. This has been termed transgenerational prophylaxis.

== Value to humans ==
In an interview with Neil Campbell, Eloy Rodriguez describes the importance of biodiversity to medicine:

Some of the compounds we've identified by zoopharmacognosy kill parasitic worms, and some of these chemicals may be useful against tumors. There is no question that the templates for most drugs are in the natural world.

== Media ==
- 2002 British documentary television series Weird Nature episode 6 "Peculiar Potions" documents variety of animals engaging in intoxication or zoopharmacognosy.
- 2014 documentary Dolphins - Spy in the Pod shows dolphins getting intoxicated on pufferfish.

== See also ==
- Biomimicry
- List of abnormal behaviours in animals
- Mineral lick
- Pica (disorder)
- Wound licking
