= Shua language =

Khoe language spoken in Botswana

Shua
- Native to: Botswana
- Region: Nata
- Ethnicity: Shwakhwe
- Native speakers: 2,000 (2013)
- Language family: Khoe–Kwadi: Khoe; Kalahari (Tshu–Khwe); East; Shua

Language codes
- ISO 639-3: shg
- Glottolog: shua1254
- ELP: Shua

Shua /ˈʃuːə/ SHOO-ə, or Shwakhwe, is a Khoe language (Ost-Kxoe) of Botswana. It is spoken in central Botswana (in Nata and its surroundings), and in parts of the Chobe District in the extreme north of Botswana. There are approximately 6,000 speakers (Cook 2004) and approximately 2,000 out of those 6,000 speakers are native speakers. The linguistic variety spoken in the township of Nata in northeast Botswana is highly endangered and spoken fluently only by adults over about thirty years of age. The term Shwakhwe means people (khwe) from the salty area (shwa).

== Dialects ==
Shua is a dialect cluster.

- Deti (10 or fewer speakers)
- Ganádi
- Shwa-khwe
- Nǀoo-khwe
- Kǀoree-khoe or ǀOree-khwe
- ǁʼAiye or ǀAaye
- ǀXaise or ǀTaise
- Tshidi-khwe or Tcaiti or Sili or Shete Tsere
- Danisi or Demisa or Madenasse or Madinnisane
- Cara
- ǁGoro (ǁ᪶Oro) or ǀXaio

The term Hietshware (Hietʃware, Hietʃo) is used for varieties of both Shua and its sister-language Tshwa.

Tsʼixa (200 speakers) is evidently a distinct language.

== Phonology ==
=== Consonants ===
		Labial	Dental	Alveolar		Lateral	Palatal	Velar		Glottal
Click	nasal		ᵑǀ	ᵑǃ		ᵑǁ				
Click	voiceless		ᵏǀ	ᵏǃ		ᵏǁ	ᵏǂ			
Click	voiced		ᶢǀ	ᶢǃ		ᶢǁ				
Click	aspirated		ǀʰ	ǃʰ		ǁʰ				
Click	ejective		ǀʼ	ǃʼ		ǁʼ	ǂʼ			
Click	uvular		ǀq			ǁq	ǂq			
Click	prenasal		ᵑǀᶢ			ᵑǁᶢ				
Nasal		m		n			ɲ	ŋ		
Plosive/ Affricate	voiceless	p		t	ts			k		ʔ
Plosive/ Affricate	voiced	b		d	dz			ɡ		
Plosive/ Affricate	aspirated			tʰ	tsʰ			kʰ		
Plosive/ Affricate	ejective			tʼ	tsʼ			kʼ	(kxʼ)	
Plosive/ Affricate	prenasal							ᵑɡ		
Fricative				s				x		h
Approximant							j			
Cluster
+Velar fricative			ǀˣ	ǃˣ		ǁˣ				
+Vd +Velar fricative						ᶢǁˣ				
+Nasal +Velar fricative			ᵑǀᶢˣ			ᵑǁᶢˣ				
+Velar ejective			ǀˣʼ			ǁˣʼ				

- /kxʼ/ is only phonemic in the Tsʼixa and Danisi dialects.

=== Vowels ===
Shua has the five vowels /a e i o u/, and three nasal vowels /ĩ ã ũ/.

== Syntax ==
Unlike most Khoisan languages, but like Nama, the most neutral word order is SOV, though word order is relatively free. As with most Khoisan languages, there are postpositions. There is a tense-aspect marker ke which often appears in second position in affirmative sentences in the present tense, giving X Aux S O V order (e.g. S Aux O V).

Kʼarokwa ke ǀʼuizi ʼa gam
boys ASP rock-PL OBL throw
"The boys are throwing rocks"

ǀʼui-zi ʼa ke kʼarokwa gam
rock-PL OBL ASP boys throw
"The boys are throwing rocks"

This marker appears first in certain subordinate clauses in a manner reminiscent of V2 languages such as German, where a clause-initial complementizer is in complementary distribution with a second position phenomenon (in German, it would be the finite verb which appears in second position).

=== Numerals ===
Shua has indigenous terms for numeral terms; it is a restrictive and limited system of numerals.

- ǀuˉiˉ ‘one’
- ǀam ‘two’
- ngona: ~ ‖obeˉ:ˉ ‘three’
- hatsa: ‘four’
- ǀ’oˉra: ‘a few’
- ‖hara: ‘many’

ta: ngona:-n ʔau xo:-ha
1SG three-PL fish catch-PAST
‘I caught three fish.’

Using this example, the numeral comes before the head noun. More specifically, it appears in the second "opening" of a noun phrase "following a demonstrative or determiner (if there is one), and preceding a qualifying nominal or adjective."
