= Palatal click =

Consonantal sound

Palatal click type

ǂ 𝼋
- IPA number: 179

Audio sample
- source · help

Encoding
- Entity (decimal): &#450;
- Unicode (hex): U+01C2
- X-SAMPA: =\
- Braille: ⠯ (braille pattern dots-12346) ⠱ (braille pattern dots-156)
Image

Tenuis palatal click (velar)

kǂ k𝼋

ᵏǂ ᵏ𝼋

ǂ 𝼋

Voiced palatal click (velar)

ɡǂ ɡ𝼋

ᶢǂ ᶢ𝼋

ǂ̬ 𝼋̬

Nasal palatal click (velar)

ŋǂ ŋ𝼋

ᵑǂ ᵑ𝼋

ǂ̃ 𝼋̃

Tenuis palatal click (uvular)

qǂ q𝼋

𐞥ǂ 𐞥𝼋

Voiced palatal click (uvular)

ɢǂ ɢ𝼋

𐞒ǂ 𐞒𝼋

Nasal palatal click (uvular)

ɴǂ ɴ𝼋

ᶰǂ ᶰ𝼋

The palatal or palato-alveolar clicks are a family of click consonants found, as components of words, only in southern Africa. The tongue is nearly flat, and is pulled back rather than down as in the postalveolar clicks, making a sharper sound than those consonants. ('Sharper' meaning that the energy is concentrated at higher frequencies.) The tongue makes an extremely broad contact across the roof of the mouth, making correlation with the places of articulation of non-clicks difficult, but Ladefoged & Traill (1984:18) find that the primary place of articulation is the palate, and say that "there is no doubt that [ǂ] should be described as a palatal sound".

The symbol in the International Phonetic Alphabet that represents the place of articulation of these sounds is ⟨ǂ⟩, a double-barred vertical bar. An older variant, the double-barred esh, ⟨𝼋⟩ (approximately ⨎), is sometimes seen. Either letter may be combined with a second letter or a diacritic to indicate voicing and the manner of articulation, though this is commonly omitted for tenuis clicks.

Doke noted a palatal nasal click with a slapped release, [ᵑǂ¡].

== Palatal click consonants and their transcription ==
In official IPA transcription, the click letter is combined with a ⟨k ɡ ŋ q ɢ ɴ⟩ via a tie bar, though ⟨k⟩ is frequently omitted. Many authors instead use a superscript ⟨k ɡ ŋ q ɢ ɴ⟩ without the tie bar, again often neglecting the ⟨k⟩. Either letter, whether baseline or superscript, is usually placed before the click letter, but may come after when the release of the velar or uvular occlusion is audible. A third convention is the click letter with diacritics for voicelessness, voicing and nasalization; this would require something like the guttural diacritic ◌̴ to distinguish uvular–palatal clicks. Common palatal clicks in these three transcriptions are:

Trans. I	Trans. II	Trans. III	Description
(velar)
⟨k͜ǂ⟩	⟨ᵏǂ⟩	⟨ǂ⟩	tenuis palatal click
⟨k͜ǂʰ⟩	⟨ᵏǂʰ⟩	⟨ǂʰ⟩	aspirated palatal click
⟨ɡ͜ǂ⟩	⟨ᶢǂ⟩	⟨ǂ̬⟩	voiced palatal click
⟨ŋ͜ǂ⟩	⟨ᵑǂ⟩	⟨ǂ̬̃⟩	palatal nasal click
⟨ŋ̊͜ǂʰʰ⟩	⟨ᵑ̥ǂʰʰ⟩	⟨ǂ̥̃ʰʰ⟩	aspirated palatal nasal click
⟨ŋ͜ǂˀ⟩	⟨ᵑǂˀ⟩	⟨ǂ̃ˀ⟩	glottalized palatal nasal click
(uvular)
⟨q͜ǂ⟩	⟨𐞥ǂ⟩	⟨ǂ̴⟩	tenuis palatal click
⟨q͜ǂʰ⟩	⟨𐞥ǂʰ⟩	⟨ǂ̴ʰ⟩	aspirated palatal click
⟨ɢ͜ǂ⟩	⟨𐞒ǂ⟩	⟨ǂ̴̬⟩	voiced palatal click
⟨ɴ͜ǂ⟩	⟨ᶰǂ⟩	⟨ǂ̴̬̃⟩	palatal nasal click
⟨ɴ̥͜ǂʰʰ⟩	⟨ᶰ̥ǂʰʰ⟩	⟨ǂ̴̥̃ʰʰ⟩	aspirated palatal nasal click
⟨ɴ͜ǂˀ⟩	⟨ᶰǂˀ⟩	⟨ǂ̴̃ˀ⟩	glottalized palatal nasal click

In the orthographies of individual languages, palatal clicks may be written either with digraphs based on the vertical-bar letter of the IPA, or using the Latin alphabet. Khoekhoee and most Bushman languages use the former. Orthographies using the latter include multigraphs based on ⟨ç⟩ in Juǀʼhoansi (1987 orthography) and originally in Naro, the latter since changed to ⟨tc⟩, and on ⟨qc⟩. In the 19th century, ⟨v⟩ was sometimes used (see click letters); this might be the source of the Doke letter for the voiceless palatal click, ⟨ↆ⟩, apparently a v over-struck with a vertical bar.

== Features ==
Features of palato-alveolar clicks:

- The basic articulation may be voiced, nasal, aspirated, glottalized, etc.
- The forward place of articulation is broad, with the tongue flat against the roof of the mouth from the alveolar ridge to the palate. The release is a sharp, plosive sound.
- Clicks may be oral or nasal, which means that the airflow is either restricted to the mouth, or passes through the nose as well.
- They are median consonants, which means they are produced by releasing the airstream at the midline of the tongue, rather than at the sides.
- The airstream mechanism is lingual ingressive (also known as velaric ingressive), which means a pocket of air trapped between two closures is rarefied by a "sucking" action of the tongue, rather than being moved by the glottis or the lungs/diaphragm. The release of the forward closure produces the "click" sound. Voiced and nasal clicks have a simultaneous pulmonic egressive airstream.

== Occurrence ==
Palatal clicks only occur in the southern African Khoisan languages (the Khoe, Kxʼa, and Tuu families), where they are extremely common, and in Bantu languages such as Yeyi.

Language	Word	IPA	Meaning
Khoekhoe	ǂKhoesaob	[ᵏǂ͡χòe̯̋sàȍ̯p] = [𝼋̊͜χòe̯̋sàȍ̯p]	July
Taa	ǂnûm	[ᵑǂûm] = [𝼋̃ûm]	two
ǂHaba	ǂHaba	[ᵏǂʰabá] = [𝼋̊ʰabá]	(endonym)
Naro	tcháó-kg'am (çháó-kg'am)	[ᵏǂʰáó̯kχʼam] = [𝼋̊ʰáó̯kχʼam]	to be disappointed
Yeyi		[kuᵏǂapara] = [ku𝼋̊apara]	to smash up

== Fricated palatal clicks ==
Fricated palatal click (tenuis)

𝼋

ǂᶴ

ǂǂ

ǃ͡s

Ekoka ǃKung has a series of laminal postalveolar-to-palatal clicks with a noisy, fricated release which derive historically from more prototypical palatal clicks. These have been variously described as fricated alveolar clicks and (inaccurately) as retroflex clicks. Unlike typical palatal clicks, which have a sharp, abrupt release, these have a slow, turbulent anterior release that sounds much like a short inhaled [ʃ]; they also have a domed tongue rather than a flat tongue like a typical palatal click. The release has also been described as lateral. Like the clicks they derive from, they do not have the retracted tongue root and back-vowel constraint typical of alveolar clicks. A provisional transcription for the tenuis click is ⟨ǃ͡s⟩, though this misleadingly suggests that the clicks are affricates. Another proposal is to resurrect the old ʃ-like letter for palatal clicks, ⟨𝼋⟩.

== Percussive release ==
Percussive palatal click (nasal)

ᵑǂ¡ ᵑ𝼋¡

ŋǂꜞ ŋ𝼋ꜞ

Clement Doke noted a nasal palatal click with slapped release, [ᵑǂ¡], in ǃKung, analogous to the percussive alveolar clicks of Sandawe.

== See also ==
- Alveolar click
- Bilabial click
- Dental click
- Lateral click
- Retroflex click
- Index of phonetics articles

Place →	Labial					Coronal										Dorsal					Laryngeal			
Manner ↓	Bilabial		Labiodental		Linguolabial		Dental		Alveolar		Postalveolar		Retroflex		(Alveolo-)palatal		Velar		Uvular		Pharyngeal/epiglottal		Glottal	
Nasal	m̥	m	ɱ̊	ɱ		n̼	n̪̊	n̪	n̥	n	n̠̊	n̠	ɳ̊	ɳ	ɲ̊	ɲ	ŋ̊	ŋ	ɴ̥	ɴ				
Plosive	p	b	p̪	b̪	t̼	d̼	t̪	d̪	t	d			ʈ	ɖ	c	ɟ	k	ɡ	q	ɢ	ʡ		ʔ	
Sibilant affricate							t̪s̪	d̪z̪	ts	dz	t̠ʃ	d̠ʒ	tʂ	dʐ	tɕ	dʑ								
Non-sibilant affricate	pɸ	bβ	p̪f	b̪v			t̪θ	d̪ð	tɹ̝̊	dɹ̝	t̠ɹ̠̊˔	d̠ɹ̠˔			cç	ɟʝ	kx	ɡɣ	qχ	ɢʁ	ʡʜ	ʡʢ	ʔh	
Sibilant fricative							s̪	z̪	s	z	ʃ	ʒ	ʂ	ʐ	ɕ	ʑ								
Non-sibilant fricative	ɸ	β	f	v	θ̼	ð̼	θ	ð	θ̠	ð̠	ɹ̠̊˔	ɹ̠˔	ɻ̊˔	ɻ˔	ç	ʝ	x	ɣ	χ	ʁ	ħ	ʕ	h	ɦ
Approximant		β̞		ʋ				ð̞		ɹ		ɹ̠		ɻ		j		ɰ						˷
Tap/flap		ⱱ̟		ⱱ					ɾ̥	ɾ			ɽ̊	ɽ						ɢ̆		ʡ̆		
Trill	ʙ̥	ʙ							r̥	r		r̠	ɽ̊r̥	ɽr					ʀ̥	ʀ	ʜ	ʢ		
Lateral affricate									tɬ	dɮ			tꞎ	d𝼅	c𝼆	ɟʎ̝	k𝼄	ɡʟ̝						
Lateral fricative							ɬ̪		ɬ	ɮ			ꞎ	𝼅	𝼆	ʎ̝	𝼄	ʟ̝						
Lateral approximant								l̪	l̥	l		l̠	ɭ̊	ɭ	ʎ̥	ʎ	ʟ̥	ʟ		ʟ̠				
Lateral tap/flap									ɺ̥	ɺ			𝼈̊	𝼈		ʎ̆		ʟ̆						

		BL	LD	D	A	PA	RF	P	V	U
Implosive	Voiced	ɓ			ɗ		ᶑ	ʄ	ɠ	ʛ
Implosive	Voiceless	ɓ̥			ɗ̥		ᶑ̊	ʄ̊	ɠ̊	ʛ̥
Ejective	Stop	pʼ			tʼ		ʈʼ	cʼ	kʼ	qʼ
Ejective	Affricate		p̪fʼ	t̪θʼ	tsʼ	t̠ʃʼ	tʂʼ	tɕʼ	kxʼ	qχʼ
Ejective	Fricative	ɸʼ	fʼ	θʼ	sʼ	ʃʼ	ʂʼ	ɕʼ	xʼ	χʼ
Ejective	Lateral affricate				tɬʼ			c𝼆ʼ	k𝼄ʼ	q𝼄ʼ
Ejective	Lateral fricative				ɬʼ					
Click (top: velar; bottom: uvular)	Tenuis	kʘ qʘ		kǀ qǀ	kǃ qǃ		k𝼊 q𝼊	kǂ qǂ		
Click (top: velar; bottom: uvular)	Voiced	ɡʘ ɢʘ		ɡǀ ɢǀ	ɡǃ ɢǃ		ɡ𝼊 ɢ𝼊	ɡǂ ɢǂ		
Click (top: velar; bottom: uvular)	Nasal	ŋʘ ɴʘ		ŋǀ ɴǀ	ŋǃ ɴǃ		ŋ𝼊 ɴ𝼊	ŋǂ ɴǂ	ʞ	
Click (top: velar; bottom: uvular)	Tenuis lateral				kǁ qǁ					
Click (top: velar; bottom: uvular)	Voiced lateral				ɡǁ ɢǁ					
Click (top: velar; bottom: uvular)	Nasal lateral				ŋǁ ɴǁ					
