= Tshwa language =

Kalahari language spoken in Botswana and Zimbabwe

Tsoa
- Kua, "Koisan"
- Hiechware
- Native to: Botswana, Zimbabwe
- Native speakers: (6,000 cited 2000–2013)
- Language family: Khoe–Kwadi: Khoe; Kalahari (Tshu–Khwe); East; Tsoa
- Dialects: Hiechware; Kua; Cire Cire

Official status
- Official language in: Zimbabwe (as 'Koisan')

Language codes
- ISO 639-3: Either: hio – Tsoa tyu – Kua
- Glottolog: tshw1239
- ELP: Tshwa

Tsoa, Tshwa or Tshuwau, also known as Kua and Hiechware, is an East Kalahari Khoe dialect cluster spoken by several thousand people in Botswana and Zimbabwe.

One of the dialects is Tjwao (formerly spelled 'Tshwao'), the only Khoisan language in Zimbabwe, where "Koisan" is a language officially recognised in the constitution.

== Dialects ==
Tsoa–Kua is a dialect cluster, which is still poorly studied but seems to include:

- Tsoa, also known as Hiechware and as various other combinations of Hio-, Hie-, Hai- + Chwa, Tshwa, Chuwau, Tshuwau + -re, -ri; also as Sarwa, Sesarwa (the Tswana name), Gǁabakʼe-Ntshori, Tati, and Kwe-Etshori Kwee. Zimbabwean Tjwao apparently belongs here.
- Kua, also spelled Cua and Tyhua. That is, both Tsoa and Kua may be pronounced something like [tʃwa], and it's not clear that they are distinct dialects.
- Cire Cire [tʃire tʃire], spoken in the area around Nata in Botswana.

== Phonology ==
The following inventory is of the Kua dialect:

Consonant phonemes of the Kua dialect, Mathes (2015)
			Bilabial	Dental	Alveolar		Lateral	Palatal	Velar	Uvular	Glottal
Click	nasal			ᵑǀ	ᵑǃ		ᵑǁ	ᵑǂ			
Click	voiceless			ᵏǀ	ᵏǃ		ᵏǁ	ᵏǂ			
Click	voiced			ᶢǀ			ᶢǁ	ᶢǂ			
Click	aspirated			ǀʰ			ǁʰ	ǂʰ			
Click	ejective			ǀʼ			ǁʼ				
Click	glottalized			ǀˀ	ǃˀ		ǁˀ	ǂˀ			
Nasal			m		n			ɲ	ŋ		
Plosive/ Affricate	voiceless		p		t	ts		c	k	q	ʔ
Plosive/ Affricate	aspirated		pʰ		tʰ	tsʰ		cʰ	kʰ	qʰ	
Plosive/ Affricate	ejective				tʼ	tsʼ		cʼ	kʼ	qχʼ	
Plosive/ Affricate	voiced		b		d	dz		ɟ	ɡ	ɢ	
Fricative					s					χ	h
Rhotic					r						
Approximant			w				l	j			
Clusters
Click	+fricative			ǀχ			ǁχ				
Click	+affricate			ǀqχʼ	ǃqχʼ		ǁqχʼ				
Click	+uvular	vl		qǀ	qǃ		qǁ	qǂ			
Click	+uvular	vd		ɢǀ			ɢǁ				
Click	+uvular	+asp		qǀʰ			qǁʰ	qǂʰ			
Plosive	+fricative				tχ			cχ			
Affricate	+fricative				tsχ						
Ejective	+affricate				tsqχʼ			cqχʼ			

The Cire-cire (not cited) dialect has the following consonant inventory:

Consonant phonemes of the Cire-cire dialect (not cited)
		Bilabial	Dental	Alveolar	Lateral	Palatal	Velar	Uvular	Glottal
Click	nasal		ᵑǀ	(ᵑǃ)	ᵑǁ	(ᵑǂ)			
Click	voiceless		ᵏǀ	(ᵏǃ)	ᵏǁ	(ᵏǂ)			
Click	voiced		ᶢǀ	(ᶢǃ)	ᶢǁ	(ᶢǂ)			
Click	aspirated		ǀʰ	(ǃʰ)	ǁʰ	(ǂʰ)			
Click	glottalized		ᵑǀˀ		ᵑǁˀ				
Click	affricate		(ǀqχ)		(ǁqχ)				
Nasal		m		n					
Plosive	voiceless	p		t			k	q	ʔ
Plosive	voiced	b		d			ɡ		
Affricate	voiceless					tʃ			
Affricate	voiced			dz		dʒ			
Fricative	voiceless			s		ʃ		χ	
Fricative	voiced			z					
Approximant					l				

The clicks have a very uneven distribution: Only a dozen words begin with one of the palatal clicks (ǂ), and these are replaced by dental clicks (ǀ) among younger speakers. Only half a dozen words start with one of the alveolar clicks (ǃ), and half a dozen more with one of the affricated clicks. These rather marginal sounds are placed in parentheses in the chart.

	front	back
high	i ĩ	u ũ
mid	e	o
low	a ã	

Tsoa has the five vowels /a e i o u/, and three nasal vowels /ĩ ã ũ/. It is not clear if Tsoa has long vowels, or simply sequences of identical vowels /aa ee ii oo uu/.

There are two tones, high and low, plus a few cases of mid tone.

In the northern dialect of Kua, like all other East Kalahari Khoe languages, the palatal click series has become palatal stops. Southern Kua has retained the palatal clicks, but the dental stops have palatalized, as they have in Gǀui and ǂʼAmkoe. Thus northern Kua has /ɟua/ 'ash' and /d̪u/ 'eland', whereas southern Kua has ᶢǂua 'ash' and /d̪ʲu/ (or perhaps /ɟu/) 'eland'.

== Bibliography ==
- Vossen, Rainer (ed.). 2013a. The Khoesan Languages. London & New York: Routledge.
