= Khoisan =

African ethno-linguistic grouping

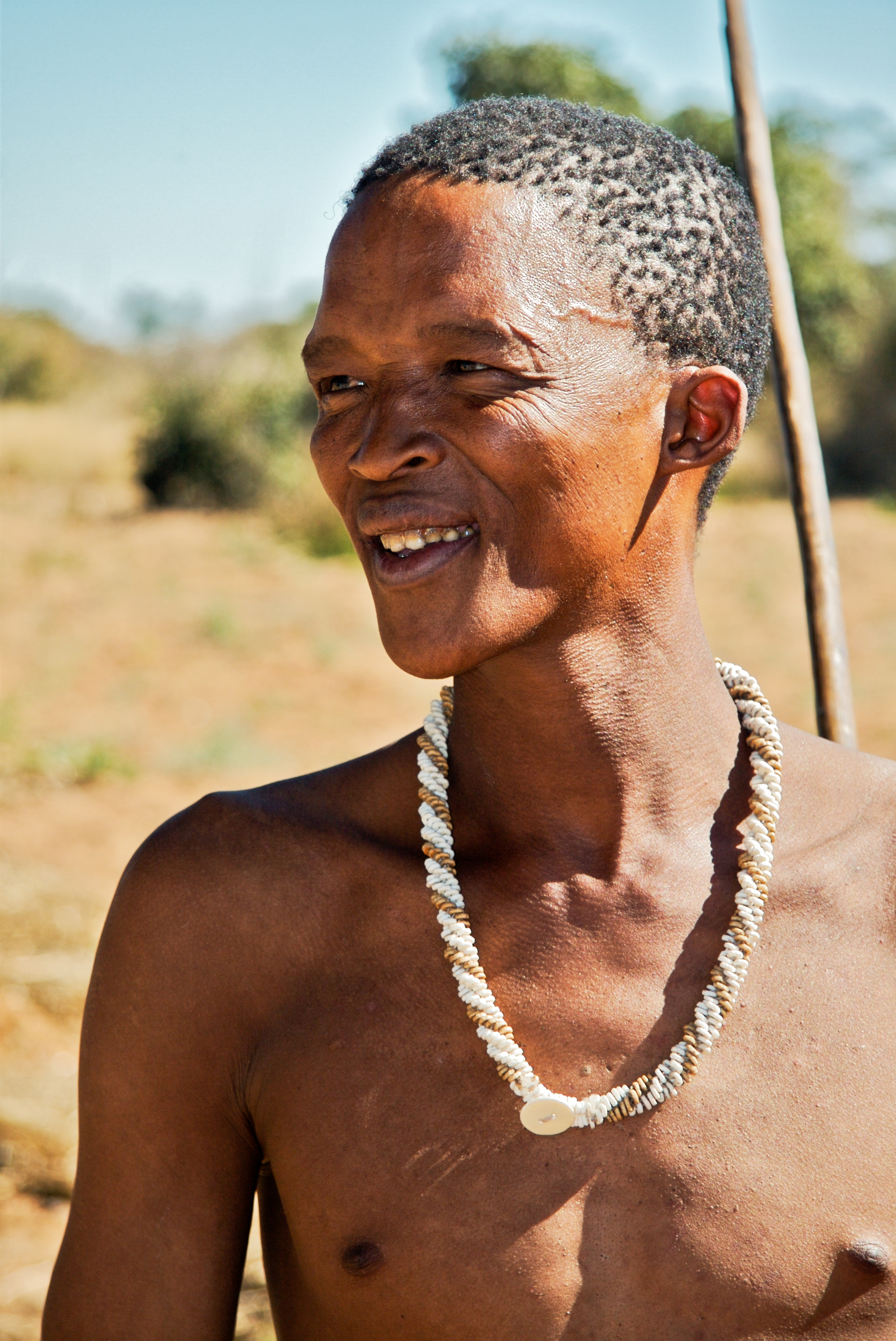
- San man of Namibia

Total population
- ~ 400,000 (c. 2010)

Regions with significant populations
- Namibia, Botswana, South Africa

Languages
- Afrikaans, Khoe languages, Kxʼa languages, Tuu languages

Religion
- Mainly Christian and African traditional religions (San religion)

Related ethnic groups
- Coloured, Griqua

Khoisan or Khoesaan (/ˈkɔɪsɑːn/ KOY-sahn) is an umbrella term for the various non-Bantu indigenous peoples of Southern Africa who traditionally speak click languages. Throughout Southern Africa, they are recognized as the historical communities that predate the Bantu expansion and European colonisation. At the time of European contact, Khoisan peoples had the largest populations in areas climatically unfavourable to Bantu sorghum-based agriculture, from the Cape region to Namibia and Botswana, with scattered populations elsewhere in the region, and were soon displaced from areas conducive to European wheat-based agriculture. They consist of two economic groups, the pastoralist Khoekhoe and the hunter-gatherer San a.k.a. Bushmen. Mingling with Bantu-speaking groups is evidenced by prevalence of click consonants in Southern African Bantu languages such as Zulu, Xhosa and Yeyi.

It is possible that some Khoisan peoples descend from an early dispersal of anatomically modern humans to Southern Africa before 150,000 years ago, though there are also suggestions that those ancestors may have been a source population for anatomically modern humans. Their languages show limited typological similarity, largely confined to the prevalence of click consonants and the kinds of similarities one can expect from a sprachbund. They are not demonstrably related to each other, but rather are classified into three separate language families (namely Khoe, Tuu and Kxʼa) that do not correspond to a separation into pastoralist Khoekhoe and forager San, as both the Khoekhoen and many of the San peoples speak Khoe languages.

The San (also spelled Saan), or Bushmen, are traditionally foragers in the Kalahari Desert, with relict populations across southern Africa. The name sān is a pejorative Khoekhoe term for foragers who do not own livestock ("those who pick from the ground"). As such, it was used for all hunter-gatherer populations who came in contact with pastoralist Khoekhoe, and refers to an economy rather than to an ethnicity. The label sān was joined with khoe ('people' in the Khoe languages) by Europeans to lump together the forager and pastoralist peoples of southern Africa in contrast with agricultural Bantu peoples.

== Name ==
The term Khoisan as an anthropological convention has been in use since the early-to-mid 20th century. It is a compound of Khoi (Khoe) and San coined by Leonhard Schultze-Jena in the 1920s and popularised by Isaac Schapera. It entered wider usage during the 1960s, based on the proposal of a Khoisan language family by Joseph Greenberg.

During the Colonial/Apartheid era, Afrikaans-speaking persons with partial Khoisan ancestry were historically also grouped as Cape Blacks (Afrikaans: Kaap Swartes) or Western Cape Blacks (Afrikaans: Wes-Kaap Swartes). This was done to distinguish them from the Bantu-speaking peoples, the other African population of South Africa who also had significant Khoisan ancestry.

The term Khoisan (also spelled KhoiSan, Khoi-San, Khoe-San) was also introduced in South African usage as a self-designation after the end of apartheid in the late 1990s. Since the 2010s, there has been a Khoisan activist movement, demanding recognition and land rights from the government and the white minority which owns large parts of the country's private land.

However, the term is also seen as problematic by many, for several reasons. Mellet argues that Leonhard Schultze-Jena, who first coined the term, was driven by a racist framing which needs to be confronted. Secondly, San people tend to reject this appellation, as expressed by a collective of San authors supported by WIMSA, who say that: "The San object to being grouped together with the presently more powerful pastoralist KhoeKhoen for academic and linguistic reasons". A third reason is that the relationship between the Khoekhoen and the various San peoples has been complex with evidence that commandos with Khoekhoe participation or even Khoekhoe leadership played an important role in the genocide against the Cape San people in the 18th and 19th centuries.

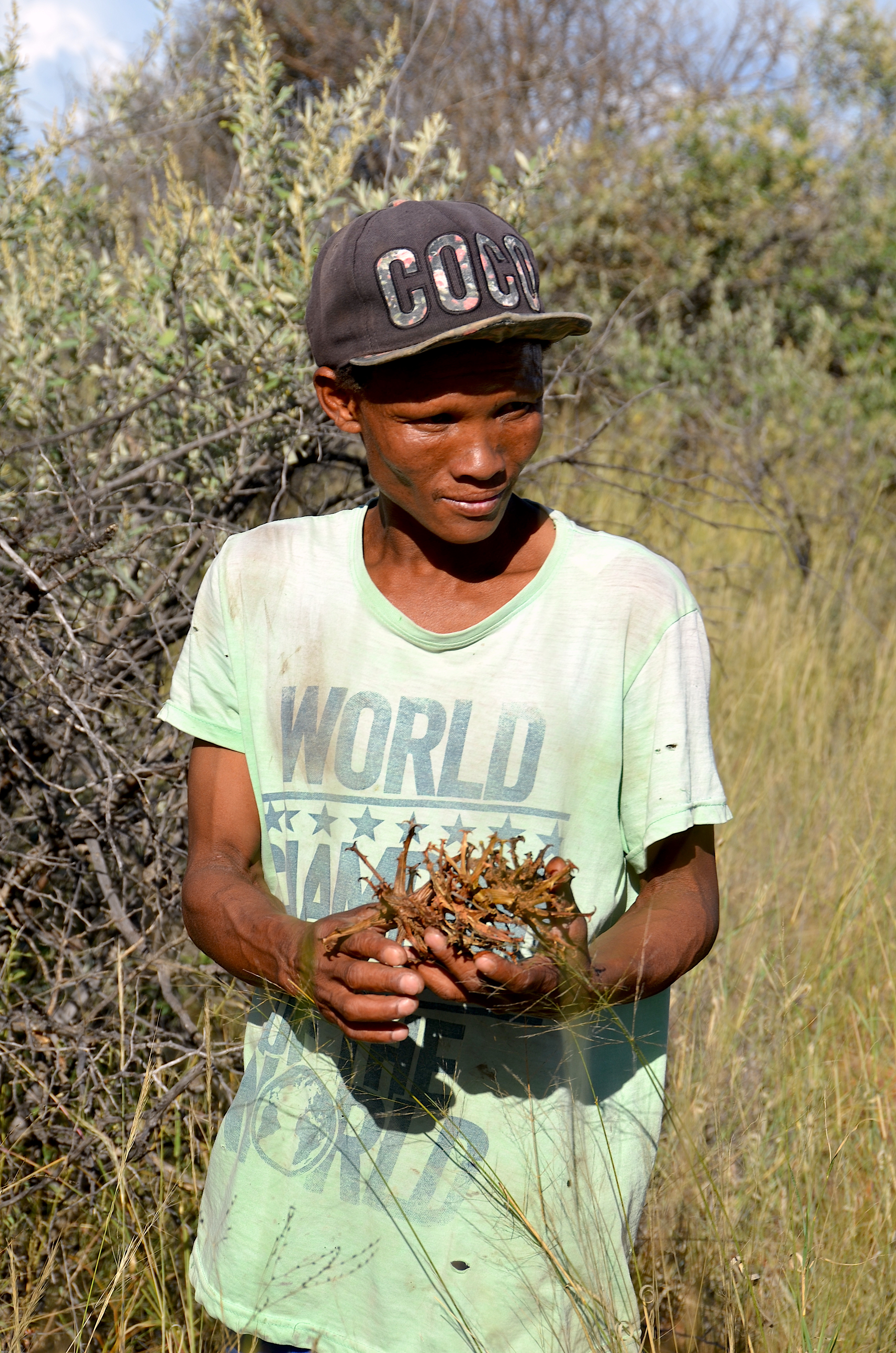
San man collecting devil's claw

== History ==
=== Origins ===
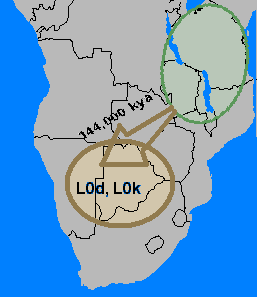
Approximate area of the origin of L0d and L0k haplogroups in southern Africa, dated to before 90,000 years ago by Behar et al. (2008).

It is suggested that the ancestors of the modern Khoisan expanded to southern Africa (from East or Central Africa) before 150,000 years ago and possibly as early as before 260,000 years ago. By the beginning of the MIS 5 "megadrought" 130,000 years ago, there were two ancestral population clusters in Africa; bearers of mt-DNA haplogroup L0 in southern Africa, ancestral to the Khoi-San, and bearers of haplogroup L1-6 in central/eastern Africa, ancestral to everyone else. This group gave rise to the San population of hunter gatherers. A much later wave of migration, around or before the beginning of the Common Era, gave rise to the Khoe people, who were pastoralists.

Due to their early expansion and separation, the populations ancestral to the Khoisan have been estimated as having represented the "largest human population" during the majority of the anatomically modern human timeline, from their early separation before 150 kya until the recent peopling of Eurasia some 70 kya. They were much more widespread than today, their modern distribution being due to their decimation in the course of the Bantu expansion. They were dispersed throughout much of southern and southeastern Africa. There was also a significant back-migration of bearers of L0 towards eastern Africa between 120 and 75 kya. Rito et al. (2013) speculate that pressure from such back-migration may even have contributed to the dispersal of East African populations out of Africa at about 70 kya.

Recent work has suggested that the multi-regional hypothesis may be supported by current human population genetic data. A 2023 study published in the journal Nature suggests that current genetic data may be best understood as reflecting internal admixtures of multiple population sources across Africa, including ancestral populations of the Khoisan.

=== Late Stone Age ===
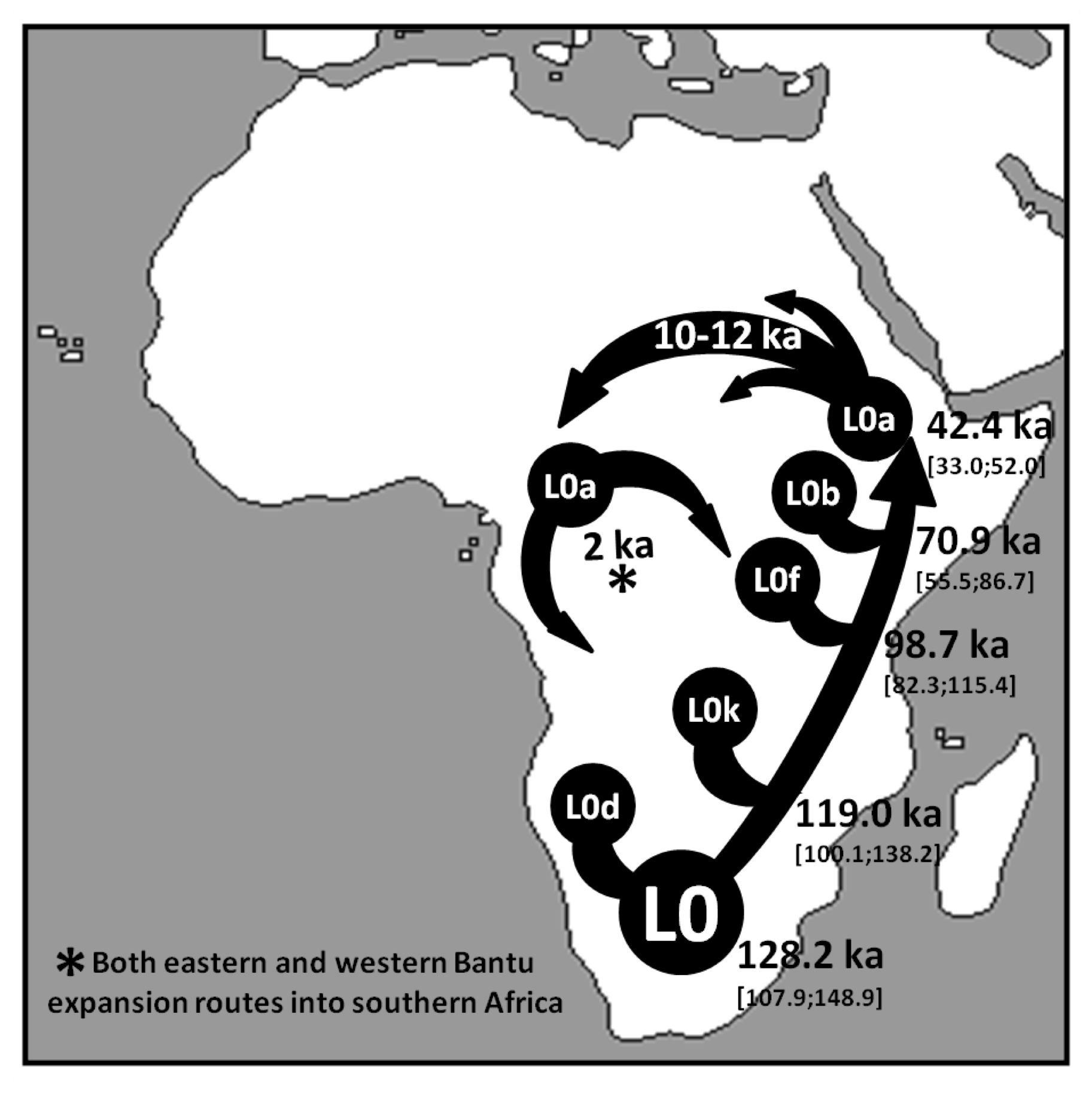
Schematic representation of the "out of South Africa" migration of the post-Eemian Middle to Late Stone Age (after 100 kya) inferred from mtDNA haplogroup L0 in modern African populations (Rito et al. 2013).

The San populations ancestral to the Khoisan were spread throughout much of southern and eastern Africa throughout the Late Stone Age after about 75 ka. A further expansion dated to about 20 ka has been proposed based on the distribution of the L0d haplogroup. Rosti et al. suggest a connection of this recent expansion with the spread of click consonants to eastern African languages (Hadza language).

The Late Stone Age Sangoan industry occupied southern Africa in areas where annual rainfall is less than a metre (1000 mm; 39.4 in). The contemporary San and Khoi peoples resemble those represented by the ancient Sangoan skeletal remains.

Against the traditional interpretation that find a common origin for the Khoi and San, other evidence has suggested that the ancestors of the Khoi peoples are relatively recent pre-Bantu agricultural immigrants to southern Africa who abandoned agriculture as the climate dried and either joined the San as hunter-gatherers or retained pastoralism.

With the hypothesised arrival of pastoralists and Bantoid agro-pastoralists in southern Africa around 2,300 years ago, linguistic developments later became evident in the adoption of click consonants and loanwords from ancient Khoisan languages. These influenced the evolution of blended agro-pastoralist and hunter-gatherer communities, which would eventually give rise to the modern, amalgamated native linguistic communities found today in South Africa, Botswana, and Namibia (e.g., in South African Xhosa, Sotho, Tswana, Zulu people).

Today these groups represent the quantitative majority of extant admixed ancient Khoisan descendants by the millions.

=== Historical period ===
The Khoikhoi entered the historical record with their first contact with Portuguese explorers, about 1,000 years after their displacement by the Bantu. Local population dropped after the Khoi were exposed to smallpox from Europeans. The Khoi waged more frequent attacks against Europeans when the Dutch East India Company enclosed traditional grazing land for farms. Khoikhoi social organisation were profoundly damaged and, in the end, destroyed by colonial expansion and land seizure from the late 17th century onwards. As social structures broke down, some Khoikhoi people settled on farms and became bondsmen (bondservants) or farm workers; many were incorporated into existing Khoi clan and family groups of the Xhosa people. Georg Schmidt, a Moravian Brother from Herrnhut, Saxony, now Germany, founded Genadendal in 1738, which was the first mission station in southern Africa, among the Khoi people in Baviaanskloof in the Riviersonderend Mountains. Early European settlers sometimes intermarried with Khoikhoi women, resulting in a sizeable mixed-race population now known as the Griqua. The Griqua people would migrate to what was at that time the frontierlands of the Xhosa native reserves and establish Griqualand East, which contained a mostly Xhosa population.

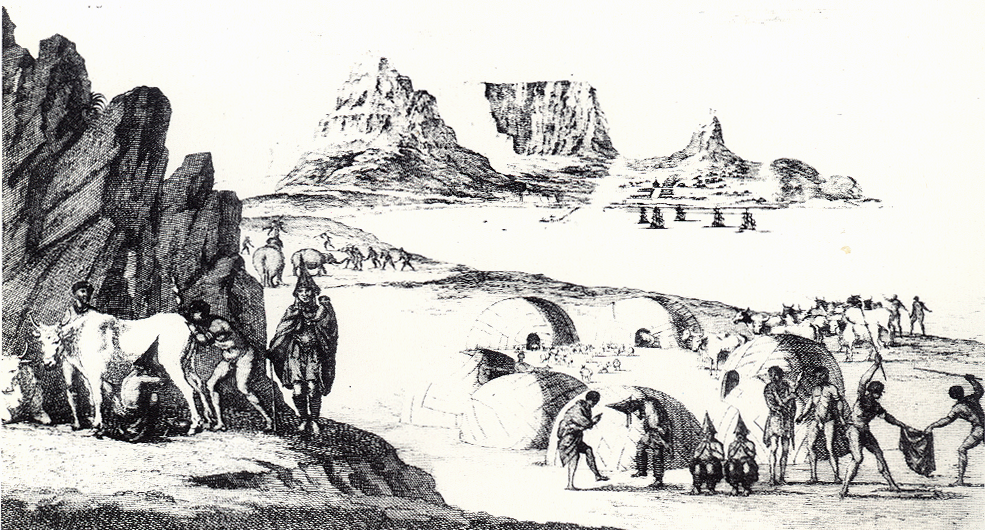
A Khoikhoi settlement in Table Bay, as depicted in an engraving in Abraham Bogaert's Historische Reizen, 1711

Andries Stockenström facilitated the creation of the "Kat River" Khoi settlement near the eastern frontier of the Cape Colony. The settlements thrived and expanded, and Kat River quickly became a large and successful region of the Cape that subsisted more or less autonomously. The people were predominantly Afrikaans-speaking Gonaqua Khoi, but the settlement also began to attract other Khoi, Xhosa and mixed-race groups of the Cape.

The so-called "Bushman Wars" (1673–1677) were largely a response by San communities to their dispossession and colonial expansion by Dutch settlers.

At the start of the 18th century, the Khoikhoi in the Western Cape lived in a state dominated by the Dutch. By the end of the century the majority of the Khoisan operated as 'wage labourers', not that dissimilar to slaves. Geographically, the further away the labourer was from Cape Town, the more difficult it became to transport agricultural produce to the markets. The issuing of grazing licences north of the Berg River in what was then the Tulbagh Basin propelled colonial expansion in the area. This system of land relocation led to the Khoijhou losing their land and livestock as well as dramatic change in the social, economic and political development.

After the defeat of the Xhosa rebellion in 1853, the new Cape Government endeavoured to grant the Khoi political rights to avert future racial discontent. The government enacted the Cape franchise in 1853, which decreed that all male citizens meeting a low property test, regardless of colour, had the right to vote and to seek election in Parliament. The property test was an indirect way by the British Cape Government (who took over from the Dutch in 1812) to retain a racist based system of governance because on average only white people owned property adequate to meet the test.

In the Herero and Nama genocide in German South-West Africa, over 10,000 Nama are estimated to have been killed during 1904–1908.

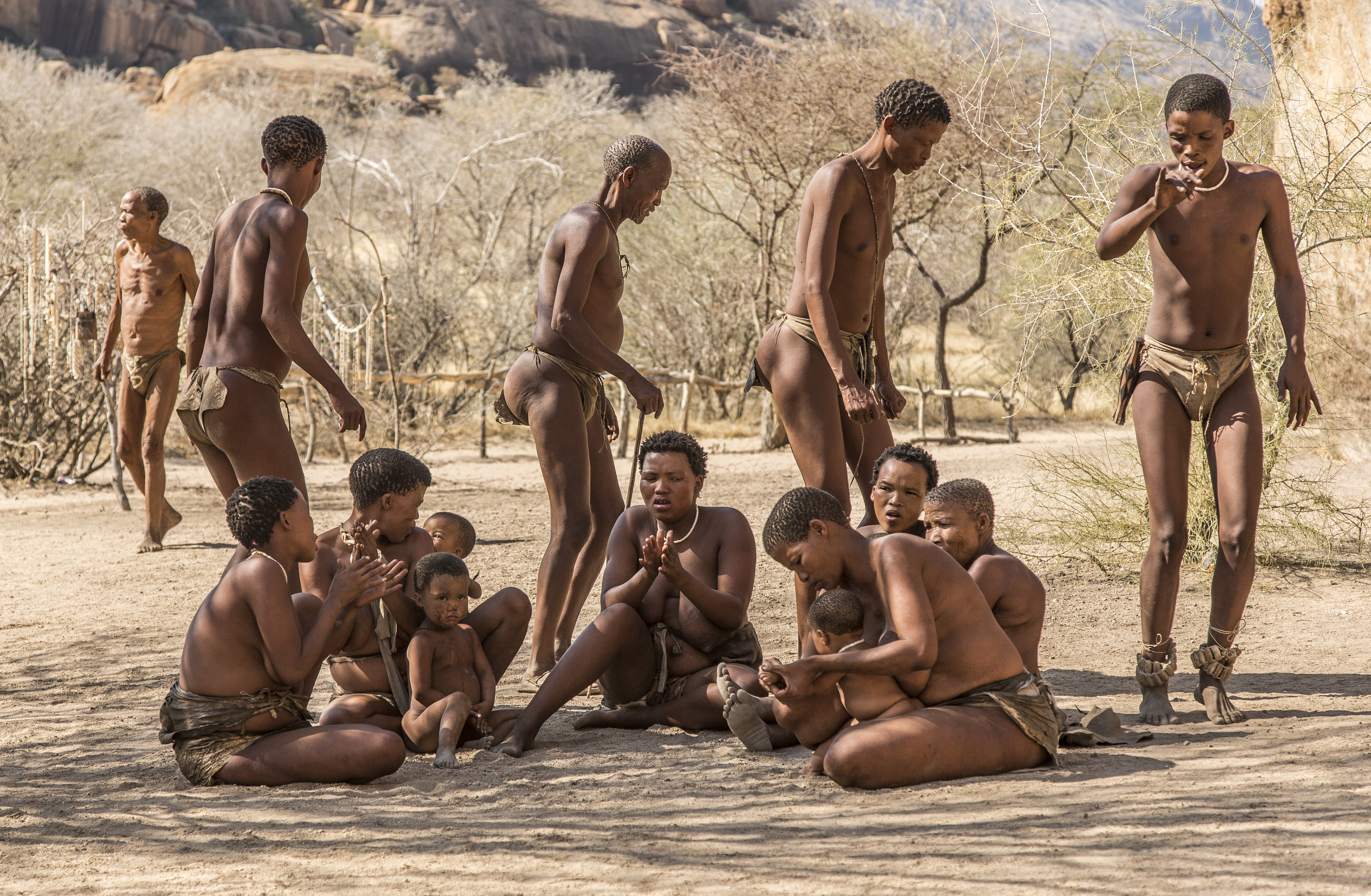
San family in Namibia

The San of the Kalahari were described in Specimens of Bushman Folklore by Wilhelm H. I. Bleek and Lucy C. Lloyd (1911). They were brought to the globalised world's attention in the 1950s by South African author Laurens van der Post in a six-part television documentary. The Ancestral land conflict in Botswana concerns the Central Kalahari Game Reserve (CKGR), established in 1961 for wildlife, while the San were permitted to continue their hunter-gatherer lifestyle. In the 1990s, the government of Botswana began a policy of "relocating" CKGR residents outside the reserve. In 2002, the government cut off all services to CKGR residents. A legal battle began, and in 2006 the High Court of Botswana ruled that the residents had been forcibly and unconstitutionally removed. The policy of relocation continued, however, and in 2012 the San people (Basarwa) appealed to the United Nations to force the government to recognise their land and resource rights.

Following the end of apartheid in 1994, the term "Khoisan" has gradually come to be used as a self-designation by South African Khoikhoi as representing the "first nations" of South Africa vis-a-vis the ruling Bantu majority. A conference on "Khoisan Identities and Cultural Heritage" was organised by the University of the Western Cape in 1997. and "Khoisan activism" has been reported in the South African media beginning in 2015.

The South African government allowed Khoisan families (up until 1998) to pursue land claims which existed prior to 1913. The South African Deputy Chief Land Claims Commissioner, Thami Mdontswa, has said that constitutional reform would be required to enable Khoisan people to pursue further claims to land from which their direct ancestors were removed prior to 9 June 1913.

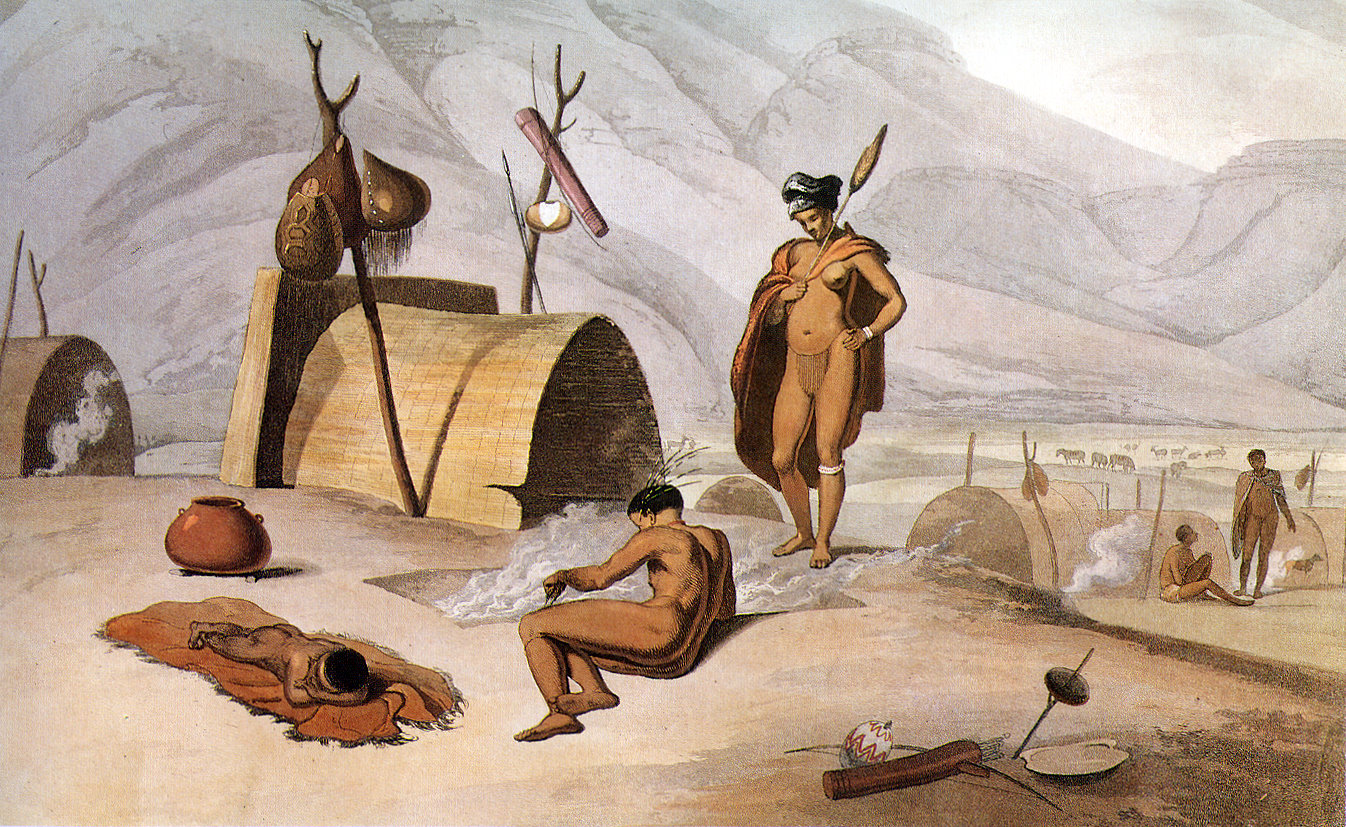
"Bosjemans frying locusts", aquatint by Samuel Daniell (1805).

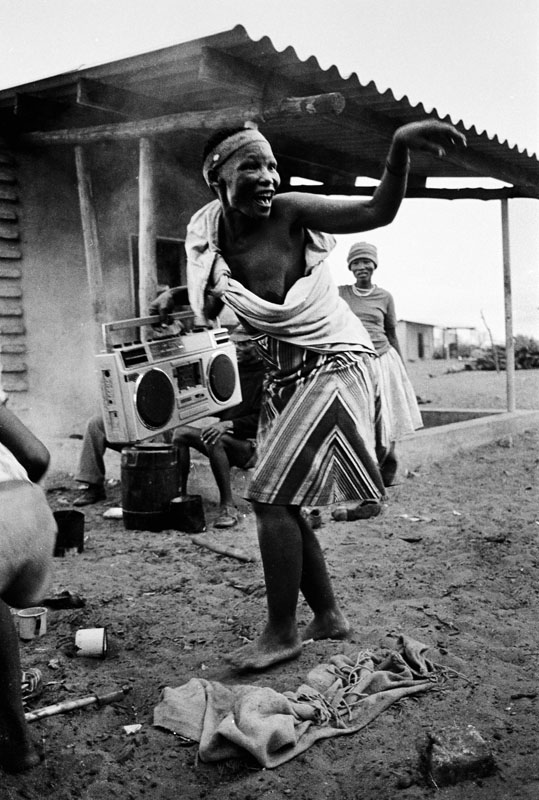
San woman in Namibia (1984 photograph)

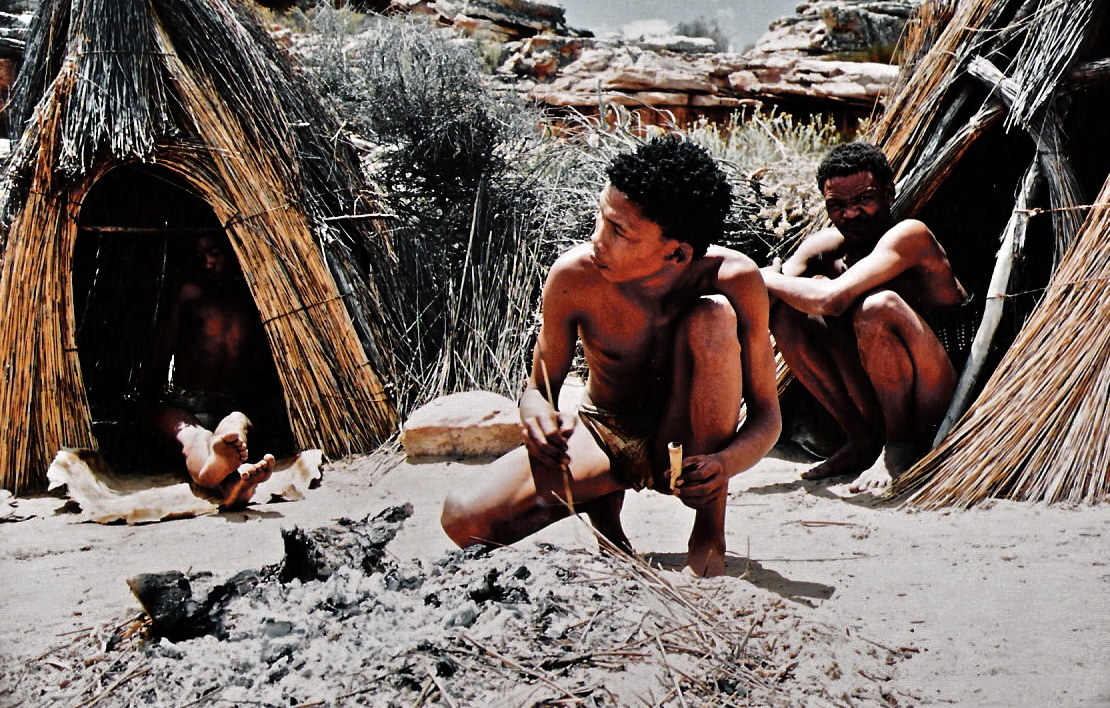
Bushman camp 2005

In 2025, representatives of the Khoisan community sought greater recognition as a First Nation of South Africa, advocating for the acknowledgment of their traditional leadership structures and their rights to ancestral land. In this context, Regent Xami Thomas has been recognized as a representative of the Khoisan people. He has highlighted the indigenous connection of the Khoisan people to the land of South Africa, drawing a parallel to the indigenous ties of the Jewish people to the land of Israel As part of their efforts to claim indigenous and territorial rights, the Khoisan people submitted a memorandum to the South African Parliament, urging formal recognition of their unique status.

=== Discoveries ===
In 2019, scientists from the University of the Free State discovered 8,000-year-old carvings made by the Khoisan people. The carvings depicted a hippopotamus, horse, and antelope in the 'Rain Snake' Dyke of the Vredefort impact structure, which may have spiritual significance regarding the rain-making mythology of the Khoisan.

== Violence against the Khoisan ==
=== Herero and Nama genocide ===
During the Herero and Nama genocide, about 10,000 Nama, a Khoekhoe group, and an unknown number of San people were killed in an extermination campaign by the German Colonial Empire between 1904 and 1908.

=== Forced relocation in Botswana ===
In Botswana, many of the indigenous San people have been forcibly relocated from their land to reservations. To make them relocate, they were denied access to water on their land and faced arrest if they hunted, which was their primary source of food. Their lands lie in the middle of the world's richest diamond field. Officially, the government denies that there is any link to mining and claims the relocation is to preserve the wildlife and ecosystem, even though the San people have lived sustainably on the land for millennia. On the reservations they struggle to find employment, and alcoholism is rampant.

== Languages ==
Green: The modern distribution of the Khoisan languages spoken by Khoi and San peoples, plus the Sandawe language of the Sandawe people and Hadza language of Tanzania.

The "Khoisan languages" were proposed as a linguistic phylum by Joseph Greenberg in 1955. Their genetic relationship was questioned later in the 20th century, and the term now serves mostly as a convenience term without implying genetic unity, much like "Papuan" and "Australian" are. Their most notable uniting feature is their click consonants.

They are categorised in two families, and a number of possible language isolates.

The Kxʼa family was proposed in 2010, combining the ǂʼAmkoe (ǂHoan) language with the ǃKung (Juu) dialect cluster. ǃKung includes about a dozen dialects, with no clear-cut delineation between them. Sands et al. (2010) propose a division into four clusters:

- Northern ǃKung (Sekele), spoken in Angola around the Cunene, Cubango, Cuito, and Cuando rivers (but with many refugees now in Namibia),
- North-Central ǃKung (Ekoka), spoken in Namibia between the Ovambo River and the Angolan border,
- Central ǃKung, spoken around Grootfontein, Namibia, west of the central Omatako River and south of the Ovambo River
- Southeastern ǃKung (Juǀʼhoan), spoken in Botswana east of the Okavango Delta, and northeast Namibia from near Windhoek to Rundu, Gobabis, and the Caprivi Strip.

The Khoe family is divided into a Khoikhoi (Khoekhoe and Khoemana dialects) and a Kalahari (Tshu–Khwe) branch. The Kalahari branch of Khoe includes Shua and Tsoa (with dialects), and Kxoe, Naro, Gǁana and ǂHaba (with dialects). Khoe also has been tentatively aligned with Kwadi ("Kwadi–Khoe"), and more speculatively with the Sandawe language of Tanzania ("Khoe–Sandawe"). The Hadza language of Tanzania has been associated with the Khoisan group due to the presence of click consonants.

== Physical characteristics and genetics ==
The Khoisan are one of the few populations with epicanthic folds outside of East Asia. They typically have hair texture of the tightest possible curl, a form of kinky hair sometimes referred to as "peppercorn" because of how it can roll into separate rounds on the scalp.

Charles Darwin wrote about the Khoisan and sexual selection in The Descent of Man in 1882, commenting that their steatopygia, seen primarily in females, evolved through sexual selection in human evolution, and that "the posterior part of the body projects in a wonderful manner". Historically, some females were observed by anthropologists to exhibit elongated labia minora, which sometimes projected as much as 10 centimetres (3.9 in) below the vulva when standing.. Though well documented, the motivations behind this practice and the voices of the women who perform it are rarely explored in the research.

In the 1990s, genomic studies of the world's peoples found that the Y chromosome of San men share certain patterns of polymorphisms that are distinct from those of all other populations. Because the Y chromosome is highly conserved between generations, this type of DNA test is used to determine when different subgroups separated from one another, and hence their last common ancestry. The authors of these studies suggested that the San may have been one of the first populations to differentiate from the most recent common paternal ancestor of all extant humans.

Various Y-chromosome studies since confirmed that the Khoisan carry some of the most divergent (oldest) Y-chromosome haplogroups. These haplogroups are specific sub-groups of haplogroups A and B, the two earliest branches on the human Y-chromosome tree.

Similar to findings from Y-chromosome studies, mitochondrial DNA studies also showed evidence that the Khoisan people carry high frequencies of the earliest haplogroup branches in the human mitochondrial DNA tree. The most divergent (oldest) mitochondrial haplogroup, L0d, has been identified at its highest frequencies in the southern African Khoi and San groups. The distinctiveness of the Khoisan in both matrilineal and patrilineal groupings is a further indicator that they represent a population historically distinct from other Africans.

Some genomic studies have further revealed that Khoisan groups have been influenced by 9 to 30% genetic admixture in the last few thousand years from an East African population who carried a Eurasian admixture component. Furthermore, they place an East African origin for the paternal haplogroup E1b1b found in these Southern African populations, as well as the introduction of pastoralism into the region. The paper also noted that the Bantu expansion had a notable genetic impact in a number of Khoisan groups. On the basis of PCA projections, the East African ancestry identified in the genomes of Khoe-Kwadi speakers and other southern Africans is related to an individual from the Tanzanian Luxmanda.

Geneticists in 2024 sampled ancient 10,000 year old remains from South Africa, Oakhurst Rockshelter. The examined population had a strong genetic continuity with the San and Khoekhoe. The later advent of pastoralism and farming groups in the last 2,000 years would transform the genepool of most parts of Southern Africa, but many Khoisan preserve, and are identical to the genetic signature of the older hunter-gatherers.

== Centre ==
On 21 September 2020, the University of Cape Town launched its new Khoi and San Centre, with an undergraduate degree programme planned to be rolled out in the following years. The centre will support and consolidate this collaborative work on research commissions on language (including Khoekhoegowab), sacred human remains, land and gender. Many descendants of Khoisan people still live on the Cape Flats.

== See also ==
- African Pygmies, group distinct from the Khoisan
- Bantu peoples of South Africa
- Boskop Man
- Early human migrations
- Ethnic groups in South Africa
- Indigenous peoples of Africa
- San religion

== Bibliography ==
- Barnard, Alan (2004) Mutual Aid and the Foraging Mode of Thought: Re-reading Kropotkin on the Khoisan. Social Evolution & History 3/1: 3–21.
- Coon, Carleton: The Living Races of Man (1965)
- Diamond, Jared (1999). Guns, Germs, and Steel. New York: W.W. Norton & Company. ISBN 978-0-393-31755-8..
- Hogan, C. Michael (2008) "Makgadikgadi" at Burnham, A. (editor) The Megalithic Portal
- Lee, Richard B. (1979), The ǃKung San: Men, Women, and Work in a Foraging Society. Cambridge: Cambridge University Press.
- Smith, Andrew; Malherbe, Candy; Guenther, Mat and Berens, Penny (2000), Bushmen of Southern Africa: Foraging Society in Transition. Athens: Ohio University Press. ISBN 0-8214-1341-4
- Thomas, Elizabeth Marshall (1958, 1989) The Harmless People.
- Thomas, Elizabeth Marshall (2006). The Old Way: A Story of the First People.
