= Ç =

Latin letter C with cedilla

- Ç ç

Usage
- Writing system: Latin script
- Type: Alphabetic and Logographic
- Language of origin: Old Catalan, Old Spanish
- Sound values: [s]; [t͡ʃ]; [d͡ʒ]; [t͡s]; [d͡z]; [ç]; [ɽ]; [ǂ]; [θ]; [ð]; [ɕ]
- In Unicode: U+00C7, U+00E7

History
Development
T14, Z4
- ,
  - ,
    - ,
      - ,
        - Γ γ, 𐌆
          - 𐌂 c, Ζ ζ
            - C c, Z z
              - Ꝣ ꝣ
                - Ç ç
- Time period: ~900 to present
- Descendants: None
- Sisters: Zz Źź Żż Žž Ƶƶ Ȥȥ Ɀɀ ʐ ʑ ᵶ ᶎ Ẑẑ Ẕẕ Ẓẓ Ⱬⱬ Ʒʒ Ζζ Зз З́з́ Ҙҙ Ӟӟ З̌з̌ Ӡӡ
- Transliterations: ch, c, s, ts

Other
- Associated graphs: c, ch, s, ts
- Writing direction: Left-to-Right

Ç or ç (C with cedilla, broken C) is a Latin script letter used in the Albanian, Azerbaijani, Manx, Tatar, Turkish, Turkmen, Kurdish, Kazakh, Uzbek, and Romance alphabets. Romance languages that use this letter include Catalan, French, Portuguese, and Occitan, as a variant of the letter C with a cedilla. It is also occasionally used in Crimean Tatar and in Tajik (when written in the Latin script) to represent the /d͡ʒ/ sound. It is rarely used in Balinese, usually only in the word "Çaka" during Nyepi, one of the Balinese Hinduism holidays. It is often retained in the spelling of loanwords from any of these languages in English, Basque, Dutch, Spanish and other languages using the Latin alphabet.

Form as Ci.

It was first used for the sound of the voiceless alveolar affricate /t͡s/ in Old Catalan as a simplification of "Ci".

It also originated in Old Spanish, where it stems from the Visigothic form of the letter z ⟨Ꝣ⟩.

The phoneme originated in Vulgar Latin from the palatalization of the plosives /t/ and /k/ in some conditions. Later, /t͡s/ changed into /s/ in many Romance languages and dialects. Spanish has not used the symbol since an orthographic reform in the 18th century (which replaced ç with the z, which has now been shifted to /θ/ or to /s/), but it was adopted for writing other languages.

== Usage as a letter variant in various languages ==
Evolution from Visigoth Z ⟨Ꝣ⟩ to modern ⟨Ç⟩.

In many languages, ⟨ç⟩ represents the "soft" sound /s/ where a ⟨c⟩ would normally represent the "hard" sound /k/. These include:

- Catalan. Known as ce trencada ('broken C') in this language, where it can be used before ⟨a⟩, ⟨o⟩, ⟨u⟩ or at the end of a word. Some examples of words with ⟨ç⟩ are amenaça ('menace'), torçat ('twisted'), xoriço ('chorizo'), forçut ('strong'), dolç ('sweet') and caça ('hunt'). The only two words starting with ç that can be found in the dictionary are ço ('this') and ça ('here'), which are rarely used, except for some expressions like ço que ('which'). A well-known word with this character is Barça, a common Catalan clipping of Futbol Club Barcelona. When writing by hand, Catalans don't write ç with a cedilla under it, but a symbol similar to a comma, which crosses the c (called trenc). In fact, some scholars like Jesús Alturo claim that ce trencada evolved from combining c and i (written c_{i}) instead of the letter z.
- French (cé cédille): français ('French'), garçon ('boy'), façade ('frontage'), grinçant ('squeaking'), leçon ('lesson'), reçu ('received' [past participle]). French does not use the character at the end of a word but it can occur at the beginning of a word (e.g., ça, 'that'). It is never used in French where C would denote /s/ (before e, i, y) nor before h.
- Occitan (ce cedilha): torçut ('twisted'), çò ('this'), ça que la ('nevertheless'), braç ('arm'), brèç ('cradle'), voraç ('voracious'). It can occur at the beginning or end of words.
- Portuguese (cê-cedilha, cê de cedilha or cê cedilhado): it is used before ⟨a⟩, ⟨o⟩, ⟨u⟩: taça ('cup'), braço ('arm'), açúcar ('sugar'). Modern Portuguese does not use the character at the beginning or at the end of a word (the nickname for Conceição is São, not Ção). According to a Portuguese grammar written in 1550, the letter ç had the sound of /dz/ around that time. Another grammar written around 1700 would say that the letter ç sounds like /s/, which shows a phonetic evolution that is still valid today.
- Old Galician used the ç letter, but it is no longer present in the official norm for the Galician language by the Royal Galician Academy. However, the unofficial norm for the Galician language by the AGAL reclaims ⟨ç⟩ as part of the language.
- Old Spanish used ⟨ç⟩ to represent /t͡s/.
- Early Modern Spanish used the letter ç to represent either /θ/ or /s/ before /a/, /o/, and /u/ in much the same way as Modern Spanish uses the letter z. Middle Castilian Spanish pronounced ⟨ç⟩ as /θ/. Andalusian, Canarian, and Latin American Spanish pronounced ⟨ç⟩ as /s/. A spelling reform in the 18th century eliminated ⟨ç⟩ from Spanish orthography.

In other languages, it represents the voiceless postalveolar affricate /t͡ʃ/ (like ⟨ch⟩ in English chalk):

- Albanian
- Turkish
- Friulian (c cun cedilie) before ⟨a⟩, ⟨o⟩, ⟨u⟩ or at the end of a word.
- In Manx it is used in the digraph ⟨çh⟩, which also represents /t͡ʃ/, to differentiate it from normal ⟨ch⟩, which represents /x/.

=== In loanwords only ===
- In Basque, ⟨ç⟩ (known as ze hautsia) is used in the loanword Curaçao.
- In Dutch, it can be found in some words from French and Portuguese, such as façade, reçu, Provençaals and Curaçao.
- In English, ⟨ç⟩ is used in loanwords such as façade and limaçon (although the cedilla mark is often dropped: facade, limacon).
- In Balinese, Ç is only used in the word 'Çaka' (Shaka era), for example:
  "Selamat Hari Raya Nyepi tahun Çaka 1945"
  (Happy Nyepi in Shaka 1945)

The pronunciation is similar to the slavic S.

== As a separate letter in various languages ==
It represents the voiceless postalveolar affricate /t͡ʃ/ in the following languages:

- the 4th letter of the Albanian alphabet.
- the 4th letter of the Azerbaijani alphabet.
- the 4th letter of the Dobrujan Tatar alphabet.
- the 4th letter of the Turkish alphabet.
- the 3rd letter of the Turkmen alphabet.
- the 22nd letter of the Uzbek alphabet in the 2026 modification which will come into force in April 2027.
- the 4th letter of the Kurmanji alphabet (also known as Northern Kurdish).
- the 4th letter of the Zazaki alphabet.
- the 4th letter of the historical Croatian alphabet used in the newspaper Il Regio Dalmata – Kraglski Dalmatin

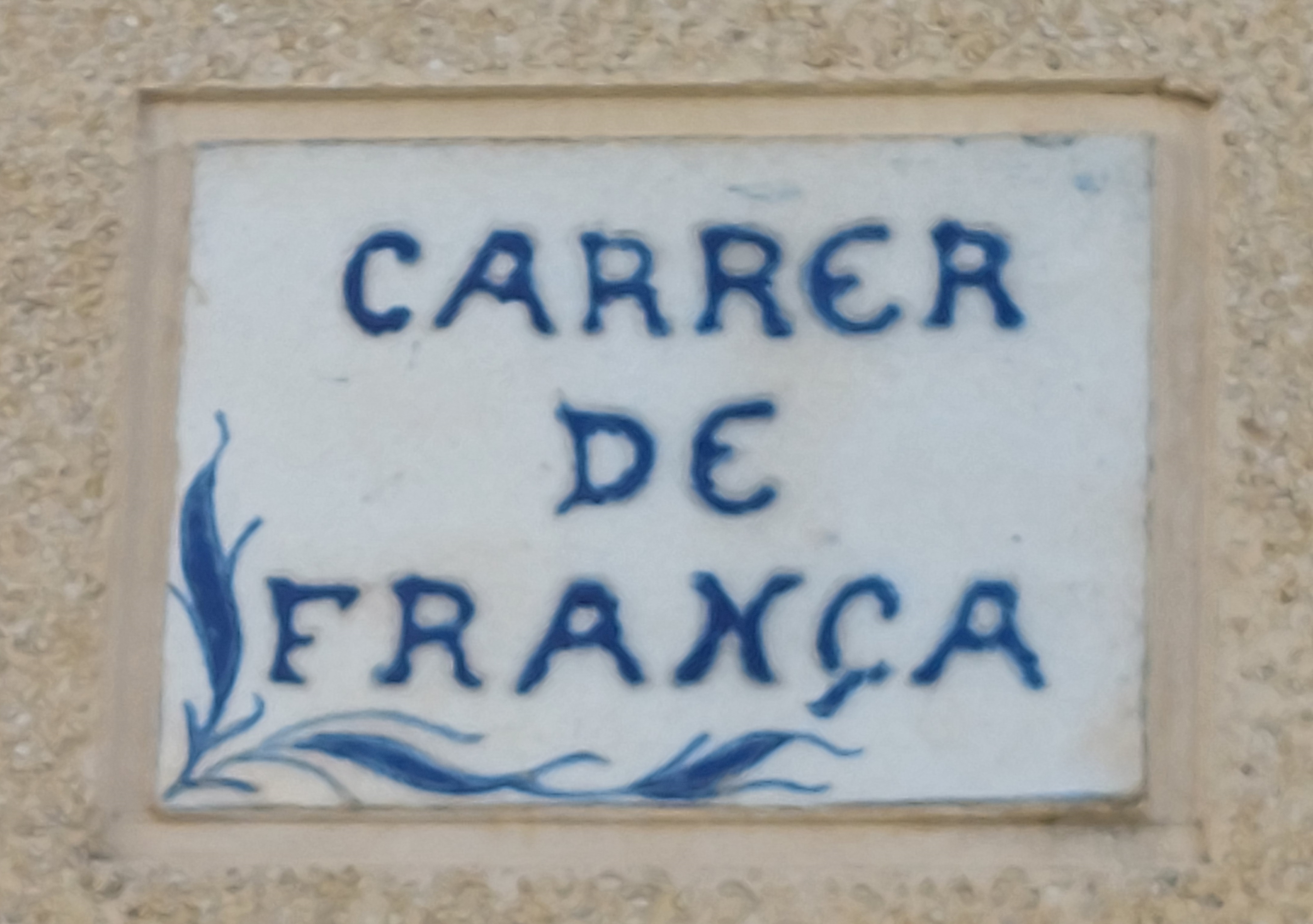
Catalan way of writing Ç.

In the 2020 version of the Latin Kazakh Alphabet, the letter represents the voiceless alveolo-palatal affricate /tɕ/, which is similar to /t͡ʃ/.

It previously represented a voiceless palatal click /ǂ/ in Juǀʼhoansi and Naro, though the former has replaced it with ⟨ǂ⟩ and the latter with ⟨tc⟩.

The similarly shaped letter the (Ҫ ҫ) is used in the Cyrillic alphabets of Bashkir and Chuvash to represent /θ/ and /ɕ/, respectively.

In Tatar, ç represents /ɕ/.

It also represents the retroflex flap /ɽ/ in the Rohingya Latin alphabet.

Janalif uses this letter to represent the voiced postalveolar affricate /d͡ʒ/

Old Malay uses ç to represent /dʒ/ and /ɲ/.

== Computer ==
- U+00C7 Ç LATIN CAPITAL LETTER C WITH CEDILLA
- U+00E7 ç LATIN SMALL LETTER C WITH CEDILLA
- U+A762 Ꝣ LATIN CAPITAL LETTER VISIGOTHIC Z
- U+A763 ꝣ LATIN SMALL LETTER VISIGOTHIC Z

=== Input ===
On Albanian, Belgian, European French, Portuguese, Spanish, Swiss, Turkish and Italian keyboards, Ç is directly available as a separate key. On most other keyboards, other methods must be used. It can also be typed with Alt+0199 (capital) and Alt+0231 (small).

== See also ==
- Ҹ
- Ḉ
