= Naro Bible =

Bible translation into the Naro language

The Naro Bible is a translation of the Bible (Bible translations) into the Naro language.

== Naro language ==
Naro /ˈnɑːroʊ/ is a Khoe language spoken in the Ghanzi District of Botswana and in eastern Namibia. There are about 14,000 speakers: 10,000 in Botswana (2004 Cook) and 4,000 in Namibia (1998 Maho), making it one of the most widely spoken of the Tshu–Khwe languages. Naro is a trade language among speakers of different Khoe languages in the Ghanzi District. There is currently a dictionary.

== The Naro speaking San (Bushmen) hear the Bible for the first time in their own language ==
"For the first time the Bible makes sense, and it feels as if God is talking to me," said one of the girls who helped the Summer Institute of Linguistics (SIL) translator write the Bible during the long translation process. But now she was hearing it for the first time on an Audibible.™ Mr. Hessel Visser led the SIL translation team to study the culture and Naro language in North West Botswana for the Khoi-San (Bushmen) of Botswana, Namibia and South Africa. He spent the last 21 years developing a written language for the 12,000 people speaking this very old language. When the language was completed, just 15 years ago, he started the task of translating the Bible into the newly written language, but very few of the Khoi-San could read it. Additionally, Hessel learned that he had terminal cancer. His prayer, along with many others, was that God would use the fruit of his "life's work" and quickly provide funding to record the Naro Bible in the newly written language for this ancient oral people group. His prayer was answered. "Funding partners" were brought together with the "translation partners" and the Davar audio recording team took the studio to the "bush." It recently produced an audio New Testament in the Naro language, and now the "Bushmen" can hear the Word of God in their own language for the first time. Translation of the Old Testament is almost finished, and will then be recorded for Audio as well.

Naro "readers" were used in the translation, as well as "proofing listeners" and technicians. The leader of the recording team noticed that one local member seemed to distance himself from the others. But the more he served as a "proofing listener" the more he wanted to engage in the newly recorded Word of God. He was even volunteering to work overtime and long long hours in order to get the job done. "It was contagious," said the Recording Director. Soon the whole community was involved and couldn't wait for the finished audio Bible.

== GNR in these Language ==
GRN is a non profit organization, and does not pay for translators or language helpers. All assistance is given voluntarily. GRN also has opportunities for Christians to contribute to evangelizing unreached people groups through audio Bible stories, Bible lessons, Bible study tools, evangelistic messages, songs and music.

== The Naro Language Project ==
The roots of the Naro Language Project lie in the efforts of the congregation of the Reformed Church in D'Kar in the 1980s to try and write their very own language. People like Aron Johannes and Dcatshau Qhomatcã spent many hours writing songs and other materials in an orthography chosen by them. Because there was felt to be a need to have a Bible translation in their language, the help of an organisation from overseas was requested. In 1991 Hessel and Coby Visser came from the Netherlands, supported by the Mission of the Christian Reformed Churches in the Netherlands.

The work of the Naro Language project, affiliated to D'kar Trust, can be divided into three major sections:

- Describe the Naro language.
- Teach people to read and write the Naro language.
- Translate the Bible in the Naro language.

== Launch of the Naro Bible ==
The translation of the New Testament into Naro has been launched as a big development to the Naro community and its language. Officially launching the Naro language New Testament in Dkar on Saturday, Minister of Infrastructure, Science and Technology Mr Johnnie Swartz said the Bible has always been a source of comfort and inspiration for many, therefore crucial to have it written in one's own language. Swartz urged the Naro-speaking community to embrace the gesture and use the Bible as well as the dictionary for better understanding of the word of God to change their lives. He said he is aware that the project of that magnitude could not have been without challenges, adding that the most obvious one is the transition that the San are making from their traditional lifestyle of hunting and gathering to a more modern lifestyle resulting in striking poverty. The secretary general of the Bible Society of Botswana, Reverend Gabriel Tsuaneng said the translation of the New Testament is to hearten the Naro people by having God's word in their language.

Rev. Tsuaneng said the project will assist other agencies in developing Naro materials aimed at increasing literacy among Naro people. The Naro language project started in 1991 at the initiation of the Reformed Church in Dkar with the help of Dutch Churches in the Netherlands. The project also produced a Naro dictionary.
