= Tjwao dialect =

Moribund Khoe language of western Zimbabwe

Tjwao
- Tshwao
- Native to: Zimbabwe
- Native speakers: <20 (2014)
- Language family: Khoe: Kalahari (Tshu–Khwe); East; Tsoa; Tjwao

Official status
- Official language in: Zimbabwe (as "Koisan")

Language codes
- ISO 639-3: –
- Glottolog: tjwa1234

Tjwao (formerly Tshwao) is an endangered Khoe language spoken by fewer than 8 people in the Tsholotsho District of Zimbabwe, all over 60 years of age. A slightly larger group of 100 have passive or partial knowledge of the language.

It is the only Khoisan language in Zimbabwe, where "Koisan" is an officially recognised language in the constitution.

Tjwao belongs to the Tshwa (Tsoa-Kua) cluster of East Kalahari Khoe languages. It is very similar to the varieties of Ganade noted by Westphal and Traill. Although mentioned by scholars for several decades, documentation of the language only began in 2012.
