= Flapped click =

A flapped click may be:

- A percussive alveolar click or percussive palatal click with a 'slapped' or 'flapped' release, as found for example in Sandawe
- A phonetically reduced, tapped click, analogous to a flap consonant, as found for example in Hadza
