= Dekar =

Village in Botswana

Coordinates: 21°32′S 21°56′E

Location of Dekar

Dekar, alternatively D'kar, is a village in Ghanzi District of Botswana. It is located 40 km to the east of the district capital, Ghanzi. The population was 943 in the 2001 census. It was a farm of the Gereformeerde Church, but later evolved into a rural village after being donated to the Naro. The village is governed by the Dutch Reformed Church, which is made up of San leaders in Dekar. A tar road runs 1 km from it, but there is no tar road in the village itself, only a gravel road. This small village also houses Kuru, a San initiative. It has a shop where handcrafted San articles can be bought. The money is then used to help the Kalahari people. Dekar also houses a school and a clinic. About 15 to 20 km outside Dekar there is a game farm on the road to Ghanzi.

Dekar is the closest populated place to the antipode of Honolulu, Hawai‘i. It's nearly perfectly antipodal to the town of Wahiawā, Hawai‘i.

.
