= Naro language =

Khoe language of Botswana and Namibia

Naro
- Nharo
- Native to: Botswana, Namibia
- Ethnicity: Ncoakhoe
- Native speakers: roughly 10,000 (2011); 8,000 in Botswana (2014) and 1,000 in Namibia (2011) about as many L2 speakers in Botswana
- Language family: Khoe–Kwadi: Khoe; Kalahari (Tshu–Khwe); West; Naro

Language codes
- ISO 639-3: nhr
- Glottolog: naro1249
- ELP: Naro

Naro /ˈnɑːroʊ/, also Nharo, is a Khoe language spoken in Ghanzi District of Botswana and in eastern Namibia. It is one of the most-spoken of the Tshu–Khwe languages. Naro is a trade language among speakers of different Khoe languages in Ghanzi District. There exists a dictionary.

== Phonology ==
Naro has the following consonant inventory (in the IPA) as described by Miller (2011), whereas the orthographic symbols were proposed by Visser (2001):

Consonant phonemes of Naro
| | Labial | Dental click | Alveolar | | | Lateral click | Palatal click | Velar | Glottal |
| | Labial | Dental click | stop | affricate | click | Lateral click | Palatal click | Velar | Glottal |
|---|---|---|---|---|---|---|---|---|---|
| Aspirated | pʰ ⟨ph⟩ | ᵏǀʰ ⟨ch⟩ | tʰ ⟨th⟩ | tsʰ ⟨tsh⟩ | ᵏǃʰ ⟨qh⟩ | ᵏǁʰ ⟨xh⟩ | ᵏǂʰ ⟨tch⟩ | kʰ ⟨kh⟩ | |
| Tenuis | p ⟨p⟩ | ᵏǀ ⟨c⟩ | t ⟨t⟩ | ts ⟨ts⟩ | ᵏǃ ⟨q⟩ | ᵏǁ ⟨x⟩ | ᵏǂ ⟨tc⟩ | k ⟨k⟩ | |
| Voiced | b ⟨b⟩ | ᶢǀ ⟨dc⟩ | d ⟨d⟩ | dz ⟨z⟩ | ᶢǃ ⟨dq⟩ | ᶢǁ ⟨dx⟩ | ᶢǂ ⟨dtc⟩ | ɡ ⟨gh⟩ | |
| Nasal | m ⟨m⟩ | ᵑǀ ⟨nc⟩ | n ⟨n⟩ | | ᵑǃ ⟨nq⟩ | ᵑǁ ⟨nx⟩ | ᵑǂ ⟨ntc⟩ | | |
| Glottalized | | ᵑǀˀ ⟨cʼ⟩ | | | ᵑǃˀ ⟨qʼ⟩ | ᵑǁˀ ⟨xʼ⟩ | ᵑǂˀ ⟨tcʼ⟩ | | |
| Fricated | | ǀkχ ⟨cg⟩ | tχ ⟨tg⟩ | tsχ ⟨tsg⟩ | ǃkχ ⟨qg⟩ | ǁkχ ⟨xg⟩ | ǂkχ ⟨tcg⟩ | (kχ ⟨kg⟩) | |
| Fricated ejective | | ǀkχʼ ⟨cgʼ⟩ | | tsʼ ⟨tsʼ⟩ | ǃkχʼ ⟨qgʼ⟩ | ǁkχʼ ⟨xgʼ⟩ | ǂkχʼ ⟨tcgʼ⟩ | kχʼ ⟨kgʼ⟩ | |
| Fricative | f ⟨f⟩ | | s ⟨s⟩ | | | | | x ⟨g⟩ | h ⟨h⟩ |
| Flap | | | ɾ ⟨r⟩ | | | | | | |

The phonemes /kχ/ and /kχʼ/ (spelt ⟨kg⟩ and ⟨kgʼ⟩) only contrast for some speakers: kgʼám ‘mouth’ vs. kgʼáù ‘male’. The flap /ɾ/ only occurs word-medially except in loan words. The lateral /l/ is only found in loans, and is generally substituted by /ɾ/ medially, and by /n/ initially. Medial [j] and [w] may be /i/ and /u/; they occur initially only in wèé ‘all, both’ and in yèè (an interjection).

=== Vowels ===
Naro has five vowel qualities, /a e i o u/, which may occur long (/aː eː iː oː uː/ spelt ⟨aa ee ii oo uu⟩), nasalized (/ã ẽ ĩ õ ũ/), pharyngealized (/aˤ eˤ iˤ oˤ uˤ/ , spelt ⟨a̱ e̱ i̱ o̱ u̱⟩, and combinations of these (/ãˤ ẽː/ ⟨ã̱ ẽe⟩ etc.). There are three tones: high, mid, and low

=== Syllable structure ===
Syllables are in general simple in Naro, with the maximal shape CV(V)C, where VV is a long vowel or diphthong. The only consonant that occurs in coda position is /m/, as in /ᵏǁám̀/ xám̀ ‘to smell’. However, long nasal vowels such as /ãː/ may occur with an excrescent [ŋ] as in [ãŋ]. Syllabic /m n/ also occur, as in /n̩.nā/ nna. Nasals such as /m/ can also form syllable nuclei, as in /hḿḿ/.

== Orthography ==
Naro orthography uses the Latin alphabet, and is partially based on the systems for Zulu and Xhosa, especially as far as clicks are represented. Digraphs are used for clicks, and to represent affricates. Vowel length is represented by doubling of the vowel, whereas the orthography utilizes the tilde to represent nasality (⟨ã ẽ ĩ õ ũ⟩), and underline to represent pharyngealization. Tones are written with diacritics both on vowels and nasal consonants, with the exception of the mid tone, which is not represented (e.g. ⟨á a à ḿ m̀ ń ǹ⟩).

Below is an overview of Naro clicks in both orthography and IPA (Visser 2001). The dental click is represented by c. alveolar click by q, palatal click by tc, and lateral click by x. All examples are from Visser (2001).

Naro clicks in orthography and IPA
| Orthography | IPA | Example | Orthography | IPA | Example | Orthography | IPA | Example | Orthography | IPA | Example |
|---|---|---|---|---|---|---|---|---|---|---|---|
| c | ǀ | cõose 'owl' | q | ǃ | qaò 'rise (sun, moon)' | tc | ǂ | tcúú 'head' | x | ǁ | xòa 'cave' |
| cg | ǀχ | cgàa 'flesh' | qg | ǃχ | qgóé 'to run' | tcg | ǂχ | tcgáí 'eye' | xg | ǁχ | xgóà 'angry' |
| cg' | ǀχʼ | cg’õè 'name' | qg' | ǃχʼ | qg’áó 'neck' | tcg' | ǂχʼ | tcg’áì 'sharp, spicy' | xg' | ǁχʼ | xg’ari 'to squeeze' |
| ch | ǀʰ | cóá 'child' | qh | ǃʰ | qhàò 'people, tribe, kind' | tch | ǂʰ | tchàà 'wide' | xh | ǁʰ | xhãya 'West, Namibia' |
| c' | ǀ̃ˀ | c’áò 'blood' | q' | ǃ̃ˀ | q’óà 'afraid' | tc' | ǂ̃ˀ | tc’ubi 'egg' | x' | ǁ̃ˀ | x’áà 'light (n.)' |
| dc | ǀ̬ | dcoàbà 'spider' | dq | ǃ̬ | dqàne 'chin' | dtc | ǂ̬ | dtcìì 'fat (adj.)' | dx | ǁ̬ | dxàí 'cheek' |
| nc | ⁿǀ̃ | nco̱à 'red' | nq | ǃ̃ | nqàrè 'foot' | ntc | ǂ̃ | ntcùú 'black' | nx | ǁ̃ | nxào 'joke' |

== Dialects ==
Naro is a dialect cluster.

- ǀAmkwe
- ǀAnekwe
- Gǃinkwe
- ǃGingkwe
- Gǃokwe
- Qabekhoe or Qabekho or ǃKabbakwe
- Tsʼaokhoe or Tsaukwe or Tsaokhwe
- Tserekwe
- Tsorokwe
- Nǀhai-ntseʼe or Nǁhai or Tsʼao

and possibly ǂHaba.

== Naro Language Project ==
The Naro Language Project is a project currently being undertaken by the Reformed Church in D'kar that aims to describe and develop an understanding of the Naro language, increase literacy by teaching Naro speakers to read and write their language and translate the Bible into Naro. The project was started in the 1980s. The Naro language project has, as of 2007, translated 70% of the Bible into the Naro language.

== Numerals ==
Below are Naro numerals, from Visser (2001). Only 'one', 'two', and 'three' are native Naro numerals, while the rest have been borrowed from Nama. Orthography is given first, followed by IPA in brackets.

1. cúí /|úí/
2. cám̀ /|ám̀/
3. nqoanà /ᵑǃōa̯nà/
4. hàka /hàkā/
5. koro /kōɾō/
6. nqáné /ǃnáné/
7. hõò /hṍò/
8. kaisà /kāi̯sà/
9. khòesí [kʰo᷅e̯sí/
10. dìsí /dìsí/

== Bibliography ==
- Visser, Hessel (2001) Naro Dictionary: Naro–English, English–Naro. Gantsi, Botswana: Naro Language Project. ISBN 99912-938-5-X
