= ǂHaba language =

Khoe languages of Botswana

ǂHaba
- Native to: Botswana
- Ethnicity: ǂHaba
- Language family: Khoe–Kwadi: Khoe; Kalahari (Tshu–Khwe); West; Naro; ǂHaba

Language codes
- ISO 639-3: –
- Glottolog: qabe1238

ǂHaba (ǂHabá) is a dialect of the Naro language, one of the Khoe languages, spoken in Botswana. Traditionally included in the Gǁana dialect cluster, it appears to be closer to Naro. It is endangered, with most ǂHaba speaking Naro.

== Phonology ==
ǂHaba has the click inventory of Naro, with the glottalized series that not all Naro dialects have.

=== Tones ===
There are seven tones in (bimoraic) roots with a nasal onset (high and mid level, high and low falling, mid–low, low–mid, and low–high), six tones with a voiceless onset, and four tones elsewhere (voiced but not nasal).

== Bibliography ==
- Nakagawa, Hirosi (2017) [July 11-13, 2011]. Fehn, Anne-Maria (ed.). ǂHaba Tonology. 4th International Symposium on Khoisan Languages and Linguistics. Riezlern. pp. 109–119.
