= Khoe languages =

Language family

Khoe
- Central Khoisan (obsolete)
- Geographic distribution: Namibia and the Kalahari Desert
- Linguistic classification: Khoe–Kwadi: Khoe
- Proto-language: Proto-Khoe
- Subdivisions: Khoekhoe; Tshu–Khwe

Language codes
- Glottolog: khoe1241
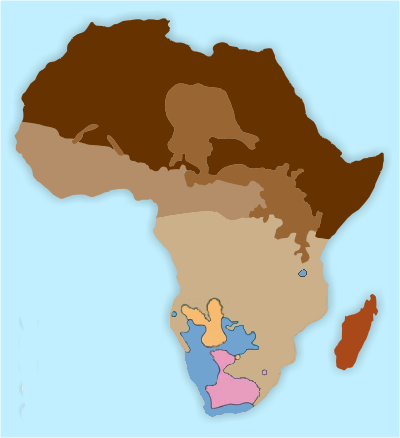
- Historical range of Khoe languages in blue (excluding the two small separated areas).

The Khoe or Khoi (/ˈkweɪ/ KWAY) languages are the largest of the non-Bantu language families indigenous to Southern Africa.

The most numerous and only well-known Khoe language is Khoekhoe (Nama/Damara) of Namibia. The rest of the family is found predominantly in the Kalahari Desert of Botswana. The languages are similar enough that a fair degree of communication is possible between Khoekhoe and the languages of Botswana.

The Khoe languages were the first Khoisan languages known to European colonists and are famous for their clicks, though these are not as extensive as in other Khoisan language families. There are two primary branches of the family, Khoekhoe of Namibia and South Africa, and Tshu–Khwe of Botswana and Zimbabwe. Except for Nama, they are under pressure from national or regional languages such as Tswana.

== History ==
Tom Güldemann believes agro-pastoralist people speaking the Khoe–Kwadi proto-language entered modern-day Botswana about 2000 years ago from the northeast (that is, from the direction of the modern Sandawe), where they had likely acquired agriculture from the expanding Bantu, at a time when the Kalahari was more amenable to agriculture. The ancestors of the Kwadi (and perhaps the Damara) continued west, whereas those who settled in the Kalahari absorbed speakers of Juu languages. Thus, the Khoe family proper has a Juu influence. These immigrants were ancestral to the north-eastern Kalahari peoples (Eastern Tshu–Khwe branch linguistically), whereas Juu neighbours (or perhaps Kxʼa neighbours more generally) to the southwest who shifted to Khoe were ancestral to the Western Tshu–Khwe branch.

Later desiccation of the Kalahari led to the adoption of a hunter-gatherer economy and preserved the Kalahari peoples from absorption by the agricultural Bantu when they spread south.

Those Khoe who continued southwestwards retained pastoralism and became the Khoekhoe. They mixed extensively with speakers of Tuu languages, absorbing features of their languages. This has resulted in Tuu and Kxʼa substrata in the Khoekhoe languages. The expansion of the Nama people into Namibia and their absorption of client peoples such as the Damara and Haiǁom took place in the 16th century and later, at about the time of European contact and colonization.

== Classification ==
The Khoe languages were once considered to be a branch of a Khoisan language family, and were known as Central Khoisan in that scenario. Though Khoisan is now rejected as a family, the name is retained as a term of convenience.

The nearest relative of the Khoe family may be the extinct Kwadi language of Angola. This larger group, for which pronouns and some basic vocabulary have been reconstructed, is called Khoe–Kwadi. However, because Kwadi is poorly attested, it is difficult to tell which common words are cognate and which might be loans. Beyond that, the nearest relative may be the Sandawe isolate; the Sandawe pronoun system is very similar to that of Khoe–Kwadi, but there are not enough known correlations for regular sound correspondences to be worked out. However, the relationship has some predictive value, for example if the back-vowel constraint, which operates in the Khoe languages but not in Sandawe, is taken into account.

Language classifications may list one or two dozen Khoe languages. Because many are dialect clusters, there is a level of subjectivity involved in separating them. Counting each dialect cluster as a unit results in nine Khoe languages:

- Khoe
  - - Khoekhoe
      - North Khoekhoe
        - Khoekhoe
        - Eini^{†}
      - South Khoekhoe
        Khoemana (Korana, Griqua)
  - - East Kalahari
      - Shua
      - Tsoa
      - ? Tsʼixa
    - West Kalahari
      - Kxoe
      - Naro
      - ? ǂHaba (closest to Naro?)
      - Gǁana

- Nama (ethnonyms Khoekhoe, Nama, Damara) is a dialect cluster including ǂAakhoe and Haiǁom
- Xiri is a dialect cluster also known as Griqua (Afrikaans spelling) or Cape Hottentot.
- Shua is a dialect cluster including Shwa, Deti, Tsʼixa, ǀXaise, and Ganádi
- Tsoa is a dialect cluster including Cire Cire and Kua
- Kxoe is a dialect cluster including ǁAni and Buga
- Naro is a dialect cluster
- Gǁana is a dialect cluster including Gǀwi. ǂHaba is often included here, but may be closer to Naro.
- Tsʼixa: it is not yet clear if Tsʼixa is closest to Shua or to Khoe.

Dozens of names are associated with the Tshu–Khwe languages, especially with the Eastern cluster. These may be place, clan or totem names, often without any linguistically identifiable data. Examples include Masasi, Badza, Didi, and Dzhiki. It is not presently possible to say which languages correspond to which names mentioned in the anthropological literature, though the majority will likely turn out to be Shua or Tshua.

In most of the Eastern Kalahari Khoe languages, the alveolar and palatal clicks have been lost, or are in the process of being lost. For example, the northern dialect of Kua has lost palatal clicks, but the southern dialect retains them. In Tsʼixa, the change has created doublets with palatal clicks vs palatal plosives.

== See also ==
- List of Proto-Khoe reconstructions (Wiktionary)
- List of Proto-Central Khoisan reconstructions (Wiktionary)
