= Tom Güldemann =

German linguist

- Born: 1965 (age 60–61); Germany
- Occupation: Linguist

Academic background
- Education: University of Cologne
- Thesis: Verbalmorphologie und Nebenprädikationen im Bantu: Eine Studie zur funktional motivierten Genese eines konjugationalen Subsystems (1995)

Academic work
- Discipline: Linguistics
- Sub-discipline: Language classification, linguistic typology
- Institutions: Humboldt University of Berlin
- Main interests: Languages of Africa

Tom Güldemann (born 1965) is a German linguist and Africanist. He is currently a professor at the Humboldt University of Berlin's Institut für Asien- und Afrikawissenschaften (IAAW, Institute of Asian and African Studies). He specializes in the languages of Africa, particularly Khoisan languages, Bantu languages, and comparative surveys of African languages and linguistics.

== Education ==
Güldemann completed his doctoral studies at the Institute for African Studies of the University of Cologne in 1995. He completed his habilitation at Leipzig University.

== Career ==
He has been a full professor at the Humboldt University of Berlin since 2006, where he specializes in African linguistics and sociolinguistics.

== Publications ==
Güldemann has edited several volumes, including The Languages and Linguistics of Africa (2018).

Edited volumes

- Güldemann, Tom (2018). The Languages and Linguistics of Africa. Berlin Boston: Walter de Gruyter GmbH & Co KG. ISBN 978-3-11-042166-8.
- Güldemann, Tom; Fehn, Anne-Maria (2014). Beyond "Khoisan". Amsterdam Philadelphia: John Benjamins. ISBN 978-90-272-4849-7.
- Güldemann, Tom; Roncador, Manfred von (2002-01-01). Reported Discourse. Amsterdam: John Benjamins. ISBN 978-90-272-2958-8.
