= Khoe–Kwadi languages =

Language family

Khoe–Kwadi
- Geographic distribution: Namibia and the Kalahari Desert
- Linguistic classification: One of the world's primary language families
- Subdivisions: Khoe; Kwadi †

Language codes
- Glottolog: khoe1240
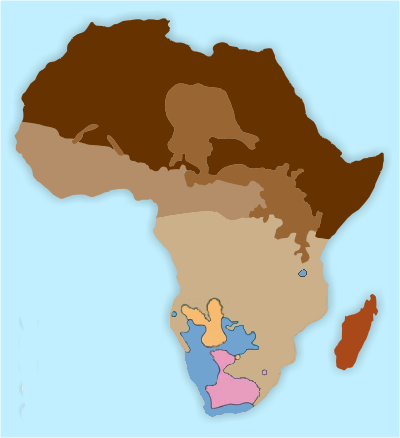
- Khoe-Kwadi languages in blue (Sandawe, also in blue in Tanzania, is possibly related)

The Khoe–Kwadi languages are a family consisting of the Khoe languages of southern Africa and the poorly attested extinct Kwadi language of Angola. The relationship has been worked out by Tom Güldemann, Edward Elderkin, and Anne-Maria Fehn.

== History ==
The Proto-Khoe-Kwadi homeland was likely in the middle Zambezi Valley, 2000–3000 years ago. The early Kwadi people migrated westwards into Angola while the early Khoe moved southwards. Khoe speakers migrated towards the Okavango Delta and the Kalahari Desert, where the harsh environment forced them to give up pastoralism and return to being hunter-gatherers. Other Khoe speakers followed much better watered routes, crossing the Limpopo River and entering the Bushveld in South Africa. in the Bushveld they met Bantu peoples for the first time, and "faced with competition from people having more productive mixed Iron Age economies, the Khoe veered off to the southwest". The Khoe eventually found two productive habitats that became focal points of settlement: one along the Orange and Vaal River and the other near the Cape of Good Hope.

== Classification ==
Pronouns and some basic vocabulary have been reconstructed as being common to Khoe and Kwadi. Because Kwadi is poorly attested, it is difficult to tell which common words are cognate and which might be loans, but about 50 lexical correspondences and a common verb construction have been identified. Westphal's fieldnotes on Kwadi were still being analyzed as of 2018, with the hope that additional grammatical parallels could be identified.

Güldemann (forthcoming) reports the following reconstructed pronominal system, of a minimal/augmented type:

Person	Minimal (sg/dual PN)	Augmented (pl PN)
1incl	*mu	?
1sg	*ti~ta (allomorphs)	?
2	*sa	*o or *u
3masc	*base-(?)-E	*base-(?)-u
3fem	*base-(s)E	*base-(?)-E

where "E" is an undetermined front vowel and the pronoun base was a deictic like *xa or a generic noun like *kho 'person'. The 3rd-person suffixes were also used on nouns, which in addition had a dual suffix *-da.

Both Kwadi and the Khoe languages have verb constructions where the first, dependent verb is marked by a suffix *-(a)Ra and the following, finite verb is unmarked.

The nearest relative of Khoe–Kwadi may be the Sandawe isolate; The Sandawe pronoun system is very similar to that of Kwadi–Khoe, but there are not enough known correlations for regular sound correspondences to be worked out. However, the relationship has some predictive value, for example if the back-vowel constraint, which operates in the Khoe languages but not in Sandawe, is taken into account.

== Phonology ==
The vowels of the protolanguage are reconstructed as oral *a *e *i *o *u and nasal *ã *ĩ *ũ, plus the diphthongs *ai *ae *ao *au *oa *oe *ue *ui and nasal *ãĩ *ũã.

Non-click consonants are reconstructed as follows. The existence of the voiced consonants in parentheses is uncertain. The nature of the consonants written in capital letters is uncertain. For instance, the *K series may have been palatal, but might be explained through consonant-vowel harmony or a ±RTR distinction. *(TS)H corresponds to /ts/ in some languages and to /h/ in others. *TSʼ probably wasn't /tsʼ/; it might even have been a click.

		Labial	Alveolar		Palatal	Velar	Glottal
Nasal		*m	*n				
Stop	voiceless	*p	*t	*ts	*K	*k	*ʔ
Stop	voiced	*b	(*d)	(*dz)		(*ɡ⁽ʷ⁾)	
Stop	aspirated		*tʰ	*(TS)H	*Kʰ	*kʰ	
Stop	glottalized		*tʼ	*TSʼ	*Kʼ	*kʼ	
Fricative			*s			*x	*h
Trill			*r				

Only dental clicks remain in Kwadi. Khoe lateral, palatal and alveolar clicks correspond to Kwadi lateral, palatal and velar stops and affricates. However, there is an additional correspondence: the Kwadi uvular affricate and fricative correspond to both lateral and alveolar clicks in Proto-Khoe, similar to the fifth click series in Proto-Kxʼa, and Fehn & Rocha (2023) hypothesize that a similar development took place in the Khoe–Kwadi languages. Thus Proto-Khoe–Kwadi may have had 5 series of click consonants. Rather than suggesting a particular phonetic value, as for example implied by the *‼ of Proto-Kxʼa, Fehn & Rocha use the wild-card symbol *Ʞ.

	Dental	Lateral	Alveolar	Palatal	Unknown
Tenuis	*ǀ	*ǁ	*!	*ǂ	*Ʞ
Voiced	*ɡǀ	*ɡǁ	*ɡ!		
Nasal	(*ŋǀ)	*ŋǁ			
Glottalized	*ǀˀ	*ǁˀ	*!ˀ	*ǂˀ	*Ʞˀ
Affricated/aspirated	(*ǀX)	(*ǁX)		*ǂX	*ꞰX
Ejective	*ǀ(x)ʼ	*ǁ(x)ʼ		*ǂ(x)ʼ	

The gaps are likely accidental and due to the small number of reconstructed words in the protolanguage.
