= Eini =

Eini may refer to:

- Eini dialect, an extinct variety of Khoekhoe on the Orange River of South Africa, sometimes listed as a distinct language or mistakenly assumed to be a variety of !Ora
- Qasr Al-Eini Museum, a historical medical museum in Cairo, Egypt
- Lea Eini, also written Lea Aini, an Israeli author and poet
- Eini, Finnish singer
