= Koegas mine =

Mine in Northern Cape, South Africa

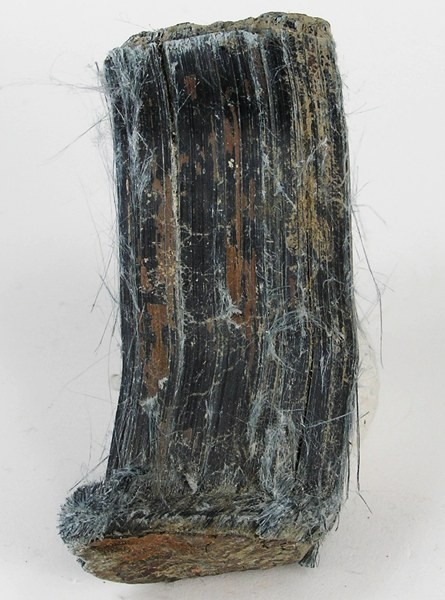
- Crocidolite from the Prieska region

- Location in South Africa
- Location: Near Prieska, Northern Cape, South Africa; 29°17′59″S 22°21′15″E
- Products: Asbestos (crocidolite)
- Opened: 1893
- Closed: 1979
- Company: Cape plc

The Koegas mine was a crocidolite (blue asbestos) mine in Northern Cape, South Africa. It lies near to the town of Prieska and drew much of its workforce from there and Griquatown; though significant proportions also came from Botswana, Zimbabwe and Malawi. The mine was opened by Cape Asbestos Company Limited in 1893. Its small-scale operations were unprofitable and it temporarily ceased work in 1903. Production resumed in 1907 and the First World War led to a boom. The mine eventually became the largest crocidolite mine in the world. After a difficult period during the Great Depression the Second World War and post-war economic boom led to an increase in production, with up to 5,000 miners on site. Extraction and milling of asbestos continued until 1979.

Worker safety concerns were raised by mine inspectors throughout its operation and the housing, sanitation and medical facilities provided by Cape were regarded as substandard. Many workers fell ill with asbestosis due to exposure to fibres and many died. A lawsuit was launched by former workers and their families in the English courts in 1998. Cape contested that the matter should be heard in the South African courts as the mine had been owned by its subsidiary registered in that country. The matter was heard in the House of Lords, which was then the highest appeals court in the country. The law lords ruled in Lubbe v Cape plc that Cape owed a duty of care to the employees of its subsidiary and allowed the case to proceed. Cape subsequently settled out of court, paying £21 million to those who claimed to have suffered ill health as a result of the mine workings.

== Geological situation ==
Koegas lies in the Northern Cape province of South Africa, some 71 kilometres (44 mi) north-west of the town of Prieska. Before 1910 it was part of Griqualand West and between then and 1995 it was part of Cape Province. Koegas lies at the southern end of the Cape Province crocidolite (blue asbestos) deposit (also known as the Asbestos Mountains), which extends for 510 kilometres (320 mi) to the north and is approximately 72 kilometres (45 mi) wide. The asbestos fibres are vertically orientated in bands within ironstone rocks of 300–760 metres (1,000–2,500 ft) thickness, At Koegas intense folding of the rocks on normal and reverse faults has resulted in many bands of asbestos overlying one another vertically in the so-called Westerberg deposit. The folding has practically eliminated any deposits to the west of the site.

The Westerberg deposit fibres are in seams of 3–102 millimetres (1/8–4 in) thickness (which determines the maximum individual fibre length). Many seams are located close to one another in "reefs" separated by bands of plain ironstone of 1.2–10.7 metres (4–35 ft) thickness. Nine reefs are present at Koegas, with the overall deposit being 46 metres (150 ft) thick, and they yield particularly high quality asbestos fibres. The fibres, which are blue in colour because of their iron protoxide content, have been noted to be stronger than those of chrysotile (white asbestos) deposits. The deposits at Koegas are overlain by mudstone.

== History of operation ==
=== Early years ===
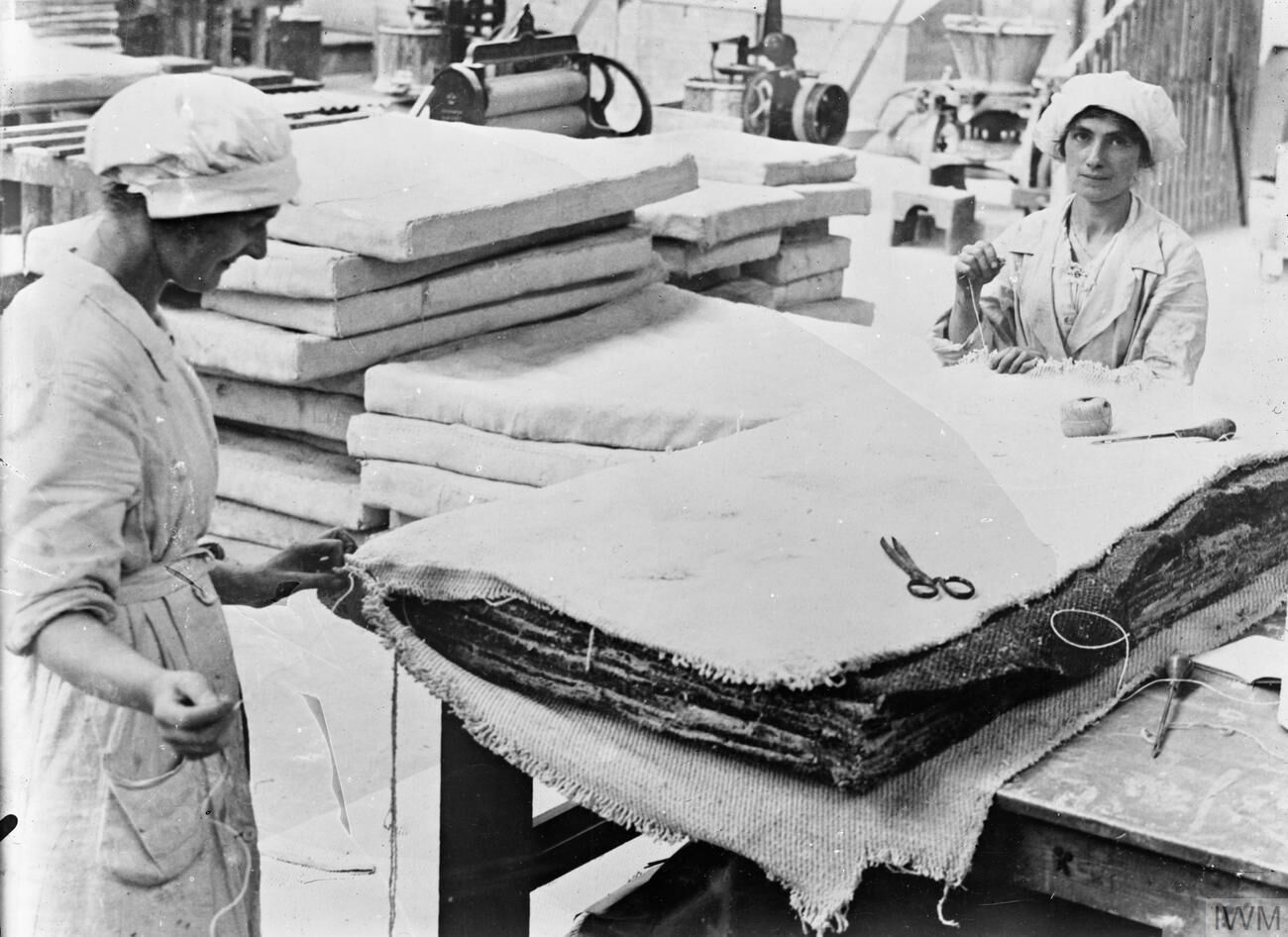
British workers making asbestos "mattresses" in 1914

The mine was opened by the Cape Asbestos Company Limited in 1893. The company had been incorporated in England that same year. By 1898 it was only a small-scale operation, producing some 100 tonnes (100 long tons) of asbestos per month from surface deposits or shallow hillside adits. The cost of extraction was around $24 per long ton. Cape initially found it difficult to break into the market, which was dominated by Canadian white asbestos. It made a loss of £3,808 on sales of £9,000 in 1898. Sales rose to £15,000 in 1899 and £15,550 in 1900 but it continued to lose money, with Cape estimating that it required annual sales of £25,000 to break even. The company scaled back operations in 1902, during which it made sales of just £1,600, and it mined nothing at all in 1903. The company resumed mining in 1907 and the following year reported a profit of £6,900. By 1908 it was selling its product for between $140 and $310 per ton, largely as "mattresses" and other boiler insulation. Demand for the mine's products grew because of the First World War (1914–18).

The workings grew into the largest blue asbestos mine in the world. The main office was site north of Orange River, with a mill and social club to the south of it. The company later expanded to operate a factory to manufacture asbestos-containing products at Benoni, near Johannesburg, as well as in Italy and the United Kingdom. In 1925 it purchased an asbestos mine at Penge, Limpopo. Demand for asbestos products crashed during the Great Depression, which began in 1929.

Mining at Koegas was carried out by drilling and blasting. Initially all drilling was carried out manually, without compressed air drills or jackhammers, and by candlelight. In such conditions it could take a miner an entire day to drill a 30 centimetres (12 in) hole. Pneumatic tools were later introduced. Asbestos and waste rock was removed manually by picks and shovels, though later conveyor belts were installed. Many of the miners came from Griquatown and were mainly black or Coloured. All of the underground workforce were male, though women and children were employed to break up the asbestos into its fibres by hand and to sort them into different grades.

=== 1940s ===
The Second World War (1939–45) saw a sharp recovery in demand for asbestos and mine production increased. A government mine inspector in 1941 reported poor worker living conditions at Koegas. No housing was provided by Cape for the workforce, with the exception of a small number of supervisors. The workers lived in self-built shanty housing near to the mine workings. The company provided no food to its workers, who had to purchase it from a company store. The inspector also judged the medical provision was poor, with only a 2/3-bed clinic provided by Cape. There was no capability to carry out any surgical work or care for serious cases; a nursing home in Prieska admitted only European persons.

By 1947 Cape officially reported that 480 men and 69 women worked at the mine, it did not count children. It is thought these numbers were under-reported and, in particular, that significantly more women were employed. These were required to prepare the mined asbestos for milling by breaking apart the fibres in a process known as "cobbing". An inspection later in that year found no washing or sanitation provision at the mine workings. When challenged the mine directors stated they were unwilling to make improvements as they judged that only 10 years of deposits remained at the site.

In 1948 the mine and mill were transferred by Cape to a South African-registered subsidiary, Cape Blue Mines (Pty.) Limited. This company and Cape's other South African interests were owned by a holding company, Cape Asbestos South Africa (Pty.) Limited (CASAP).

=== 1950s ===
After the war a world-wide economic boom saw demand for asbestos peak. Production at the site peaked in 1953, at which point some 5,000 miners worked at Koegas. In 1950 the mine started to extract from asbestos seams below the water table. These deposits, in the so-called "fresh zone", were unweathered and higher in quality. In response to government workplace legislation Cape sought permission to continue to employ children as young as 13 at Koegas. They argued that the work of sorting fibre, carried out by children on a wage of £2.85 a month, was uneconomical if men were required to be employed. A Cape advertisement of 1953 claimed the Koegas mine was a self-sufficient community with its own power station, farm, social club and swimming pool.

In September 1955 Cape employed 2,000 workers at Koegas, significant proportions of whom were from Botswana, Zimbabwe and Malawi. A further inspection in this year found living conditions for workers were still poor. The South African Director of Native Labour required that Cape remove excess families from the site. Cape agreed with this and committed to construct housing for 1,632 single workers and 202 married couples. The Director of Native Labour gave cape 6 months to make improvements. Cape did not proceed with the improvements and, when challenged, threatened to close the mine.

Cape claimed to have ceased cobbing by hand, with machines being used instead from the early 1950s. However a visitor to Koegas in 1956 noted women still being employed in this work.

=== 1960s ===
The South African Pneumoconiosis Research Unit issued a report in 1962 that noted high levels of mesothelioma in Prieska but this was suppressed by the asbestos industry. A sorting plant was built at the site in 1963, where women and children separated the longer asbestos fibres, which were ten times more valuable by weight than the shorter fibres. The mine was also affected by scurvy and tuberculosis epidemics. Those who became ill, possibly including asbestosis sufferers, remained on the site and many died. Cape relocated widows to Marydale during the 1960s, to a settlement that became known as "the lung location" for the medical conditions of the inhabitants.

=== 1970s and closure ===
Women continued to be employed to sort asbestos by hand at Koegas until the early 1970s, as recorded by the company's applications for exemptions under the 1956 Mines and Works Act No. 27. The site continued to be productive and by 1977 South Africa was the world's third-largest supplier of asbestos, extracting 390,000 tonnes (380,000 long tons) that year. Amid growing concern over safety in the wider world Cape sold the mine and mill (which were closed shortly afterwards) in 1979, though it retained an interest in the Benoni factory until 1989. After the mine's closure many former workers moved to Prieska or Griquatown. The mine and mill were Prieska's main employers and their closure were economically devastating. In 1980 unemployment in the town ran at 30% and by 2000 stood at nearly 60%.

From 1985 Prieska was declared a dust control town which required the asbestos waste piles to be covered with soil. Clean-up of the Koegas site was begun by the South African government in 2007; the tailings have now been sown with grass and fenced off and the most easily-accessible asbestos has been removed. The mine site is now considered a ghost town.

== Litigation ==
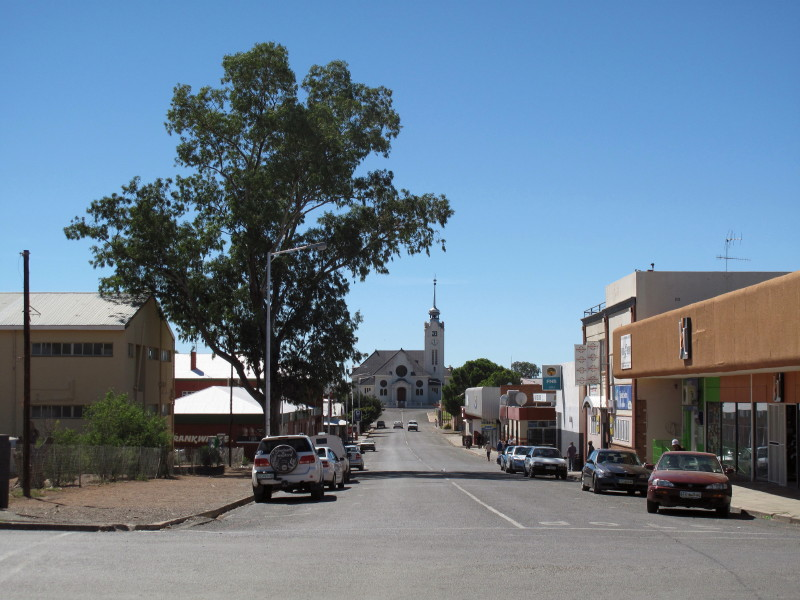
Prieska in 2010

Many residents of Prieska suffered from asbestosis and other asbestos-related disease. Exposure was either directly through working at the mine or secondarily from asbestos-containing materials in the town. The streets of Prieska were paved with asphalt containing asbestos and many buildings in the town were constructed with asbestos cement walls or roofs. Children would play in asbestos waste from the mine tailings, as it could be formed into a malleable clay-like material, and were also exposed by accompanying their mothers to work. Some 3,000 former workers are known to have died from mesothelioma, which is usually caused by asbestos exposure, by 2001.

A lawsuit was launched by 5 former works against Cape Plc in 1998 in the English High Court. Cape disputed that the case should be heard in British courts as the mine had been owned by its South African subsidiary company and should be heard in that country's courts. The High Court ruled that the action be allowed but Cape appealed to the Court of Appeal which ruled in their favour. In July 2000 the plaintiffs appealed to the House of Lords (the Lords of Appeal in Ordinary), which was then the highest court of appeal. In Lubbe v Cape plc the plaintiff argued that although the case could be heard in South African courts the judicial system there was in poor condition and likely to result in delayed justice. The law lords ruled in favour of allowing the case to proceed. The case established that British parent companies owe a duty of care to employees of foreign subsidiaries.

Cape, who has set aside £8 million to fight the case, entered into further legal arguments over the number of claimants that would be permitted, the standard of proof required and the use of test cases. The plaintiff's argued that the case was the "British Bhopal", referring to the 1984 Bhopal disaster where an explosion at a Union Carbide chemical plant in India killed thousands and injured hundreds of thousands. The plaintiffs' lawyers, part-funded by British legal aid, argued that Cape's workers were not made aware of the dangers of working with asbestos and, indeed, were encouraged to believe that it was harmless. It was also alleged that no advice was provided on the link between smoking and aggravated asbestosis symptoms, despite many of the workers being smokers. It was claimed that the workers had not been supplied with personal protective equipment even when masks were mandated in European asbestos factories by 1958. Some of Cape's workers even constructed their own cloth masks, though these were of limited use. The court heard that Cape had closed its factory at Barking in 1968 due to concerns over the health of its workers but continued operations at the plants in South Africa. It was also stated that the mine at Penge recorded dust levels 30 times those permitted under British law.

Cape argued that the area around the mine is naturally rich in asbestos fibres and there was no way to differentiate those who had been exposed occupationally. It claimed that records of employment were poor and it was not possible to prove how long workers had spent at the mine or mill. The number of plaintiffs rose to 6,000 and then to 7,500.

The plaintiffs were supported by ACTSA: Action for Southern Africa, members of which bought a nominal number of shares in Cape which allowed them to attend the company's annual general meeting. At the AGM the campaigners read out a list of plaintiffs who had died whilst waiting for the resolution of the case. The South African National Union of Mineworkers also supported the campaign and picketed the offices of the CHNU insurance company, as they owned 6% of Cape shares. The CHNU later sold its stake.

On 22 December 2001 Cape agreed a £21 million out of court settlement with the plaintiffs. It committed to pay £10 million on 30 June 2002 and a further £1 million annually for ten years Under the settlement the Legal Services Commission and the South African Government agreed to support no further claims against Cape on the matter. The company was also released from any liability to clean up the mine site. The plaintiff's solicitors, Leigh, Day & Co., were also required to destroy all documentation relating to the case. The settlement was agreed, despite difficulties Cape had in securing approval from its shareholders and creditors. At around this time the company had made out of court settlements with its British factory workers totalling £30 million for asbestosis-related industrial health issues.

== See also ==
- Chandler v Cape plc
