= Trephopoda hanoveria =

Hanover Trephopoda Ground Spider

Conservation status
- Least Concern (SANBI Red List)

Scientific classification
- Kingdom: Animalia
- Phylum: Arthropoda
- Subphylum: Chelicerata
- Class: Arachnida
- Order: Araneae
- Infraorder: Araneomorphae
- Family: Gnaphosidae
- Genus: Trephopoda
- Species: T. hanoveria

Binomial name
- Trephopoda hanoveria Tucker, 1923

Species of spider

Trephopoda hanoveria is a spider species in the family Gnaphosidae. It is endemic to the Northern Cape of South Africa and is commonly known as the Hanover Trephopoda ground spider. This species is the type species of the genus Trephopoda.

== Distribution ==
Trephopoda hanoveria is found only in the Northern Cape Province of South Africa. Notable locations include Prieska, Hanover (the type locality at Farm Eierfontein), and Hopetown. The species occurs at altitudes ranging from 950 to 1,409 m above sea level.

== Habitat and ecology ==
The species is a free-living ground dweller found in the Nama Karoo and Savanna biomes. It has also been collected from pistachio orchards, suggesting some tolerance for agricultural environments.

== Conservation ==
Trephopoda hanoveria is listed as Least Concern by the South African National Biodiversity Institute due to its relatively wide geographical range, despite being known only from females. The species is likely under-collected and requires more sampling to locate males.

== Etymology ==
The species is named after Hanover, the town near which the type specimen was collected at Farm Eierfontein.

== Taxonomy ==
The species was described by Tucker in 1923 from the type locality Eierfontein, near Hanover in the Northern Cape. It serves as the type species for the genus Trephopoda. The species has not been revised since the original description and is known only from females.
