= Marydale =

- Location within Northern Cape Location within South Africa
- Coordinates: 29°24′20″S 22°6′18″E
- Country: South Africa
- Province: Northern Cape
- District: Pixley ka Seme
- Municipality: Siyathemba

Area
  - Total: 63.35 km^{2} (24.46 sq mi)

Population (2011)
  - Total: 2,623
  - Density: 41.40/km^{2} (107.2/sq mi)

Racial makeup (2011)
  - Black African: 10.9%
  - Coloured: 84.8%
  - Indian/Asian: 1.3%
  - White: 2.7%
  - Other: 0.2%

First languages (2011)
  - Afrikaans: 96.0%
  - Xhosa: 1.0%
  - Other: 3.0%
- Time zone: UTC+2 (SAST)
- Postal code (street): 8910
- PO box: 8910
- Area code: 054

Marydale is a town in the Northern Cape province in western South Africa. Established in 1903 by the Dutch Reformed Church, Marydale was named after Mary Snyman, the wife of Mr GP Snyman, owner of the farm on which the town was laid out. The town is 76 km north-west of Prieska and lies near the N10 national road.

Marydale is 75 km north-west of Prieska and 120 km south-east of Upington. It was established in 1902 on the farm Kalkput.

== History ==
Marydale was donated as 11 undeveloped plots to the NGK by GP Snyman after he finished surveying his farm, Kalkput, in 1903.

In 1904, a delegation from Marydale visited the council meeting of the Prieska Reformed Church to explore setting up the Marydale Reformed Church as a separate congregation. The council demurred, but in 1905, Prieska began offering quarterly services in Marydale. They were so well-attended that an extra one had to be added the same day. From 1915 onward, the Prieska pastor came by train.

In 1916, proponent C.J. Brink was appointed curate and ministered for six months in Marydale, until the congregation was granted independence on November 10, 1916 by the Britstown Ring Committee. The Marydale council was invested on December 23 and acquired the remaining 108 plots of the town for £950 from Snyman. The school building was originally a church. Marydale was officially proclaimed a town in 1917 and boasted 9,000 morgans of grazing land. It was 2 miles from the Draghoender Railroad Station.

== Economy ==
Sheep and cattle farming are the main agricultural activities in an area where mining was once common. The Koegas asbestos mine, 24 km from town, was the largest blue asbestos mine in the world. The mining offices in Westerberg were quite large and formed an oasis where oranges and other fruits were grown. The decline in demand for asbestos and lingering health effects on miners cast a long shadow over the area's future. The Marydale congregation was absorbed by that of Prieska, and the Boegoeberg Dam stands nearby.

== Sources ==
- Bulpin, T.V. (2001). Discovering Southern Africa. Cape Town: Discovering Southern Africa Publications cc, 2001.
- Maeder, Rev. G.A., and Zinn, Christian (1917). Ons Kerk Album. Cape Town: Ons Kerk Album Maatschappij Bpkt.
- Olivier, Rev. P.L. (compiler) (1952) Ons gemeentelike feesalbum. Cape Town/Pretoria: N.G. Kerk-uitgewers, 1952.
- Synod History from Northern Cape Synod website. URL accessed 10 December 2019.
