= Tumʔi language =

Nearly extinct Tuu language of South Africa

Tumʔi
- Tumʼi
- Pronunciation: [tumʔi]
- Native to: South Africa
- Region: Prieska
- Native speakers: 2 semispeakers (2023)
- Language family: Tuu: ǃUi; ǀXam/Kora ?; Tumʔi

Language codes
- ISO 639-3: None (mis)
- Glottolog: None xamm1241 ǀXam (references listed there)

Tumʔi (also spelled Tumʼi) is a Tuu language, or possibly a collection of words remembered from various languages. As of 2023, it is only partially spoken by two people living in the town of Prieska in western South Africa.

== Name ==
Tumʔi was formerly referred to by its speakers as hottentots taal in Afrikaans, but the name hottentot is generally considered derogatory. The replacement name Tumʔi means 'to speak' in Tumʔi.

== Speakers ==
As of 2023, only two partial speakers of the Tumʔi language remain, Francina George (age 74 in 2023) and Robert George (age 68). The pair are siblings and were raised in a household speaking Tumʔi, although their exposure to the language varies. A more fluent speaker and older sibling, Elsie George, died around 2023; she was more knowledgeable than Francina and Robert in the language. A fourth sibling, whose name is not given, was also exposed to the language, but denied any knowledge due to "her own linguistic insecurities" and did not provide any data on the language. No complete sentences or texts wholly in Tumʔi were collected; the data consists almost entirely of individual words.

== Classification ==
Tumʔi appears to show the most similarities with the Tuu languages, hence its classification there. Its words also correspond directly to the equivalents in ǀXam, an extinct member of the Tuu family and the best documented language of the ǃUi branch of the family. Indeed, the online language database Glottolog subsumes studies on Tumʔi under ǀXam. The phonology is also substantially more similar to Tuu than to the Khoekhoe languages. The possibility exists that Tumʔi is not a distinct language, but rather an assortment of words remembered from ǀXam and Kora, a Khoe–Kwadi language; both were formerly spoken in Prieska.

== Geographical distribution ==
The Georges live in the town of Prieska in the Northern Cape province of South Africa. According to Kilian (2020), the Nama, Griekwa, ǀXam, Nǀuu, and possibly ǀʼAuni languages "might also be found in the smaller more rural sedentary towns of the northern cape". The speakers of Tumʔi also mentioned speakers of an unidentified Khoisan language living in the town of De Aar, located south of Prieska. Their mother, who was a herbalist, was born in the Kareeberg Local Municipality, geographically proximate to the two towns, and so might also host speakers of Tumʔi or other Khoisan languages.

== Phonology ==
=== Consonants ===
==== Non-click ====
Non-click consonants
		Bilabial	Labiodental	Labiovelar	Alveolar	Velar	Glottal
Plosive	tenuis	p			t	k	ʔ
Plosive	voiced	b			d	ɡ	
Plosive	aspirated				tʰ		
Plosive	palatalized				(tʲ)		
Ejective					(tʼ)		
Fricative	voiceless		f		s	x	h
Fricative	voiced	(β)	v				
Affricate					(tʃ)		
Nasal		m			n	ŋ	
Approximant				w	l		
Lateral approximant							
Trill					r		

[t], the most common plosive, occurring in both word-initial position and between vowels, is produced with varying degrees of aspiration, although certain words (e.g. [tʰiǃqo] 'God') are pronounced always with aspiration, and others (e.g. [tɔrəŋtɔrəŋ] 'crazy') always without. [k], the second most common, also occurs word-initially and medially. Finally, [p] occurs word-initially and finally. All three are much more common than their voiced counterparts, which are attested in no more than three words each.

Out of the fricatives, /s/, /f/ and /v/ are restricted to word-initial and medial positions, as is /h/, which can only occur before the vowel /a/. The velar fricative /x/ has no restrictions on its occurrence. /β/ is exclusive to the word [taβa] 'handiwork', also alternating with /v/ and /w/. The nasal /n/ can only occur as a click accompaniment in the word-initial position, but can occur both as an accompaniment and as a standalone consonant in syllable-onset and coda positions.

The phonemes /l/, /tʃ/ and /tʲ/ occur particularly infrequently. /l/ is only found in the loanword [vələ], derived from Afrikaans wilde [vəldə], and used in reference to certain medicinal plants. [tʃ] and [tʲ] alternate with each other in the word [kut͡ʃaka]~[kutʲaka] 'go out', and occur nowhere else.

==== Clicks ====
Tumʔi has four click types, at different places of articulation, and three accompaniments, making for a total of 14 click consonants. Clicks have a high functional load, meaning most words contain clicks.

Click consonants
	Dental	Lateral	Palatal	Alveolar
Plain	ǀ	ǁ	ǂ	ǃ
Uvular stop	ǀq	ǁq	ǂq	ǃq
Nasal	ŋǀ	ŋǁ	ŋǂ	ŋǃ
Velar fricative	ǀx			ǃx

Plain clicks are the least common in the dataset, with clicks typically being pronounced with some type of accompaniment; the most common are the uvular stop and nasal accompaniments. The velar fricative accompaniment is also infrequent, but is clearly audible in words like ǀxei 'give birth' and ǃxara 'type of female genitals'.

=== Vowels ===
There are six vowel phonemes in Tumʔi.

	Front	Central	Back
Close	i		u
Mid	e	ə	ɔ
Open		a	

The mid vowel [e] is realized as close-mid, and the mid vowel [ɔ] is realized as open-mid.

==== Diphthongs ====
Tumʔi also has five diphthongs, being [ae], [ei], [oi], [ui], and [ɔu]. All of them end in a high vowel, with the preceding vowel being low, mid, or back.

== Syntax ==
The closest data with any syntactic information are one or two incomplete phrases; no texts in the language could be collected.

== Sample phrases ==
Below are some sample phrases collected in the Tumʔi language.

ǀqui asa 'here comes the man'

ǂuku ǃaɹa ǃui asa 'careful, here comes the white man'

nǃuku ǃwara 'look the police'

ǃɔri seseːse, ǃɔrise asa, ǃoɹisa asa 'here comes the police'

nǀu aːsa 'white man coming'

eit xətɔf 'dressed up (male)'

eit xəwails 'dressed up (female)'

daai ǃqoita is ǃoris 'that woman is pregnant'

œʊtəre xwa 'ask for something to drink'

œʊɾərɛxəha̤a 'ask for something to eat'
