= Boegoeberg Dam =

- Interactive map of Boegoeberg Dam
- Official name: Boegoeberg Dam
- Country: South Africa
- Location: near Prieska, Northern Cape
- Coordinates: 29°2′30″S 22°12′13″E
- Purpose: Irrigation
- Construction began: 1926
- Opening date: 1933
- Owner: Department of Water Affairs

Dam and spillways
- Type of dam: Gravity dam
- Impounds: Orange River
- Height: 11 m
- Length: 622 m

Reservoir
- Creates: Boegoeberg Dam Reservoir
- Total capacity: 19 895 000 m³
- Surface area: 742 ha

Boegoeberg Dam is a gravity type dam on the Orange River, near Prieska, Northern Cape, South Africa. Building was started in 1926 and completed by 1933. Boegoeberg is named for the small tree Croton gratissimus, also known as Bergboegoe. Its primary purpose is for irrigation and it has a low hazard potential.

== History ==
Groblershoop was originally known as Sternham, after a Mr. Stern who built a small pumping station to draw water from the Orange River in the 1920s only to see it ruined by a 1925 flood. A Mr. Litchfield had already set up a hydroelectric generator and pump on the Orange in the 1890s, since he was well aware of the irrigation potential along the banks where farmers had hauled water with difficulty to their farms since 1872. Mr. Litchfield suggested a public irrigation scheme in 1895 to no avail. In 1902, Consular Agent W.D. Gordon, an engineer with the Cape Colony Department of Public Works based in Cape Town, endorsed the Litchfield proposal in vain.

In February 1911, Alfred Dale Lewis, section engineer with the Cape Town Department of Irrigation, conducted a detailed study of the lower reaches of the Orange. A pioneer of irrigation in South Africa who served as national director of irrigation from 1921 to 1941, he conducted a classic study along the Orange mostly on foot but partly on horse-cart. According to historian T.V. Bulpin, his struggles through severe heat and inhospitable terrain are unsurpassed in the annals of scientific research in South Africa. Lewis recommended building a dam near Boegoeberg (named for the Afrikaans word for the buchu plant that grows on the local hillsides) and a 130-km irrigation canal to supply 4,000 acres of irrigable land.

Halted by budget issues, the plan was revived as a low-wage make-work project for the unemployed under the Great Depression-era Carnegie Commission of Investigation on the Poor White Question in South Africa. The idea was not only to provide immediate work but also land to settle employees on to relieve their poverty long-term. The project was among several launched by the Department of Labour. Work began on May 23, 1929, starting with a 622-m-long, 10-m-high retaining wall by Zeekoe Baard's Drift. 68 sluices were raised to filter floodwater and capture silt, and the retaining wall directed water to a canal and reservoir allowing irrigation to draw from the river all the way up to Augrabies Falls. A camp was built at the isolated site, including tents and huts to house workers, stores, a school, and a clinic. Laborers were paid 7 shillings, 6 pence an hour for their heavy workload. Workers wrote poetry, danced, and sung to express their hopes that the hard work would deliver farms, factories, and houses in its wake. A foxtrot entitled "Boegoeberg's Dam" dates to this period, for example. Engineers such as Adolf Aslasksen, Sven Eklund, Gordon Allen, and D.F. Kokot supervised the work of 250 married laborers whose families made the most of the rough situation.

The dam was finished in 1933, and the following year, the first water flowed from the 121-km canal to 6,600 ha divided into 5-ha plots, each with a stone house built on it. The opening was a grand ceremony featuring speeches, prayers, and a braai, and all attendees were asked to contribute a stone to a workers' memorial, which would not be built immediately. On December 16, 1938, when the ox-wagons celebrating the centennial of the Great Trek reached Pretoria to lay the cornerstone for the Voortrekker Monument, it was decided to build the Boegoeberg Dam memorial with the original stones, to commemorate both the dam-building and the Trek. Groblershoop was founded in 1936 on the land that was once Sternham, named after P. G. W. Grobler. Minister of Lands in the J.B.M. Hertzog cabinet from 1924 to 1933. The reservoir later became a popular site for swimming, water sports, and angling, and an RV park was also built.

== See also ==
- List of reservoirs and dams in South Africa
- List of rivers of South Africa

== Sources ==
- Bulpin, T.V. (2001). Discovering Southern Africa. Cape Town: Discovering Southern Africa Publications cc.
- Van Zyl, Lokkie (2010). Boegoebergdam se mense – 'n flukse draai van die wiel. Groblershoop: Boegoeberg Watergebruikersvereniging. ISBN 0-620-22174-7
