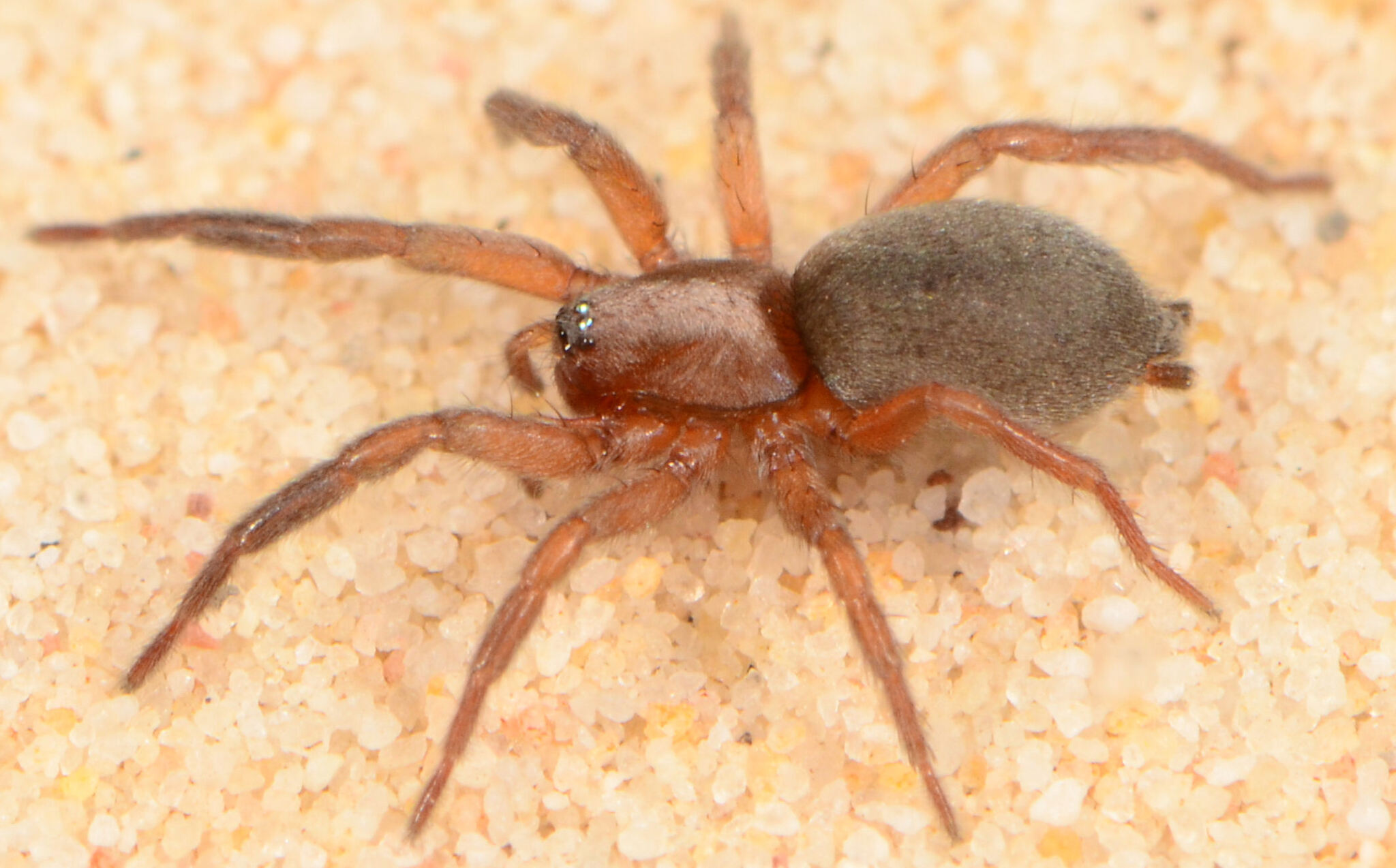
- juvenile female

Scientific classification
- Kingdom: Animalia
- Phylum: Arthropoda
- Subphylum: Chelicerata
- Class: Arachnida
- Order: Araneae
- Infraorder: Araneomorphae
- Family: Gnaphosidae
- Genus: Smionia
- Species: S. lineatipes

Binomial name
- Smionia lineatipes (Purcell, 1908)

Synonyms
- Callilepis lineatipes Purcell, 1908; Upognampa lineatipes Tucker, 1923

= Smionia lineatipes =

Species of spider

Smionia lineatipes is a southern African species of spider in the family Gnaphosidae.

== Distribution ==
Smionia lineatipes is found in Mozambique, Botswana, and South Africa.

In South Africa, it is recorded from Eastern Cape, Free State, Gauteng, Northern Cape, North West, and Western Cape. Notable locations include Dunbrody, Bloemfontein, Irene, Hanover, Clanwilliam, Matjiesfontein, and Table Mountain National Park.

== Habitat and ecology ==
The species is a free-living ground dweller found at altitudes ranging from 9 to 1,444 m above sea level. It has been sampled from Fynbos and Grassland biomes.

== Description ==
Females have a total length of 5 mm and males 4.4 mm. The carapace is light to medium brown and tinged with red anteriorly, with lateral margins slightly infuscated and the surface clothed with sparse pubescence. The eyes have a posterior row wider than the anterior row, with the posterior row straight to slightly recurved and anterior lateral eyes larger than median eyes. The sternum is the same colour as the carapace.

The mouthparts and chelicerae are dark reddish brown. The abdomen is dull testaceous, slightly infuscated, and has indistinct chevron-like markings posteriorly on the dorsal surface. The legs are a little paler than the carapace, with femora infuscated and tarsi and metatarsi tinged with red.

== Conservation ==
Smionia lineatipes is listed as Least Concern by the South African National Biodiversity Institute due to its wide range. The species faces no known threats and is protected in seven protected areas.

== Etymology ==
The species name lineatipes means "with lined feet" in Latin.

== Taxonomy ==
The species was originally described by William Frederick Purcell in 1908 as Callilepis lineatipes from Botswana. Tucker transferred it to Upognampa in 1923, and Murphy transferred it to Smionia in 2007. It is known from both sexes.
