= Trephopoda biamenta =

Scientific classification
- Kingdom: Animalia
- Phylum: Arthropoda
- Subphylum: Chelicerata
- Class: Arachnida
- Order: Araneae
- Infraorder: Araneomorphae
- Family: Gnaphosidae
- Genus: Trephopoda
- Species: T. biamenta

Binomial name
- Trephopoda biamenta (Tucker, 1923)

Species of spider

Trephopoda biamenta is a spider species in the family Gnaphosidae. It is endemic to the Western Cape of South Africa.

== Distribution ==
Trephopoda biamenta is found only in the Western Cape Province of South Africa. It occurs at a few localities including the Robertson District around Ashton, Stellenbosch, Tradouw Pass, and Montagu. The species occurs at altitudes ranging from 103 to 167 m above sea level.

== Habitat and ecology ==
The species is a free-living ground dweller that inhabits the Fynbos biome. Little is known about the species' specific habitat requirements or ecology.

== Conservation ==
Trephopoda biamenta is listed as Data Deficient for taxonomic reasons due to limited knowledge about its location, range, and threats. The placement of the male is problematic, and the species requires more sampling to collect males for proper taxonomic assessment.

== Taxonomy ==
The species was originally described by Tucker in 1923 as Upognampa biamenta from Ashton in the Robertson District. It has not been revised since the original description and is known only from females.
