= Khoekhoe language =

Khoe language spoken in southern Africa

Khoekhoe
- Khoikhoi, Nama, Damara
- Khoekhoegowab
- Pronunciation: [k͡xʰo̜͡ek͡xʰo̜͡ekowap]
- Native to: Namibia, Botswana and South Africa
- Region: Orange River, Great Namaland, Damaraland
- Ethnicity: Khoikhoi, Nama, Damara, Haiǁom, ǂKhomani
- Native speakers: 200,000 ± 10,000 (2011)
- Language family: Khoe–Kwadi: Khoe; Khoekhoe; Khoekhoe
- Dialects: Nama–Damara; Haiǁom–ǂĀkhoe; Eini †
- Writing system: Latin augmented with click letters

Official status
- Recognised minority language in: Namibia; South Africa (Note: (protected language))

Language codes
- ISO 639-3: Either: naq – Khoekhoe, Nama hgm – Haiǁom
- Glottolog: nort3245 Subfamily: North Khoekhoe nama1264 Language: Nama haio1238 Language: Haiǁom-Akhoe
- ELP: Khoekhoe
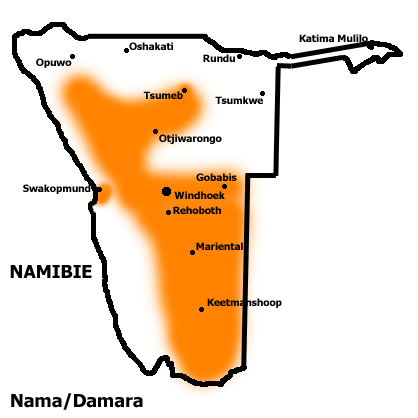
- The distribution of the Nama language in Namibia

The Khoe language
- Person: Khoe-i
- People: Khoekhoen
- Language: Khoekhoegowab

Khoekhoe or Khoikhoi (/ˈkɔɪ.kɔɪ/ KOY-koy; Khoekhoegowab, Khoekhoe pronunciation: [k͡xʰo̜͡ek͡xʰo̜͡egowab]), also known by the ethnic terms Nama (/ˈnɑː.mə/ NAH-mə; Namagowab), Damara (ǂNūkhoegowab), or Nama/Damara and formerly the pejorative term Hottentot, (Note: The term was applied to Cape Khoekhoe in particular. In modern times, the term is seen as offensive.) is the most widespread of the non-Bantu languages of Southern Africa that make heavy use of click consonants and therefore were formerly classified as Khoisan, a grouping now recognized as obsolete. It belongs to the Khoe language family, and is spoken in Namibia, Botswana, and South Africa primarily by three ethnic groups: Namakhoen, ǂNūkhoen, and Haiǁomkhoen.

== History ==
The Haiǁom, who had spoken a Juu language, later shifted to Khoekhoe. The name for the speakers, Khoekhoen, is from the word khoe ('person'), with reduplication and the suffix -n to indicate the general plural. Georg Friedrich Wreede was the first European to study the language, after arriving in ǁHui!gaeb (later Cape Town) in 1659.

== Status ==
Khoekhoe is a national language in Namibia. In Namibia and South Africa, state-owned broadcasting corporations produce and broadcast radio programmes in Khoekhoe.

It is estimated that only around 167,000 speakers of Khoekhoe remain in Africa, which makes it an endangered language. In 2019, the University of Cape Town ran a series of short courses teaching the language, and 21 September 2020 launched its new Khoi and San Centre. An undergraduate degree programme is being planned to be rolled out in coming years.

== Dialects ==
Modern scholars generally see three dialects:

- Nama–Damara, incl. Sesfontein Damara
- Haiǁom
- ǂĀkhoe, itself a dialect cluster, and intermediate between Haiǁom and the Kalahari Khoe languages

They are distinct enough that they might be considered two or three distinct languages.

- Eini (extinct) is also close but is now generally counted as a distinct language.

== Phonology ==
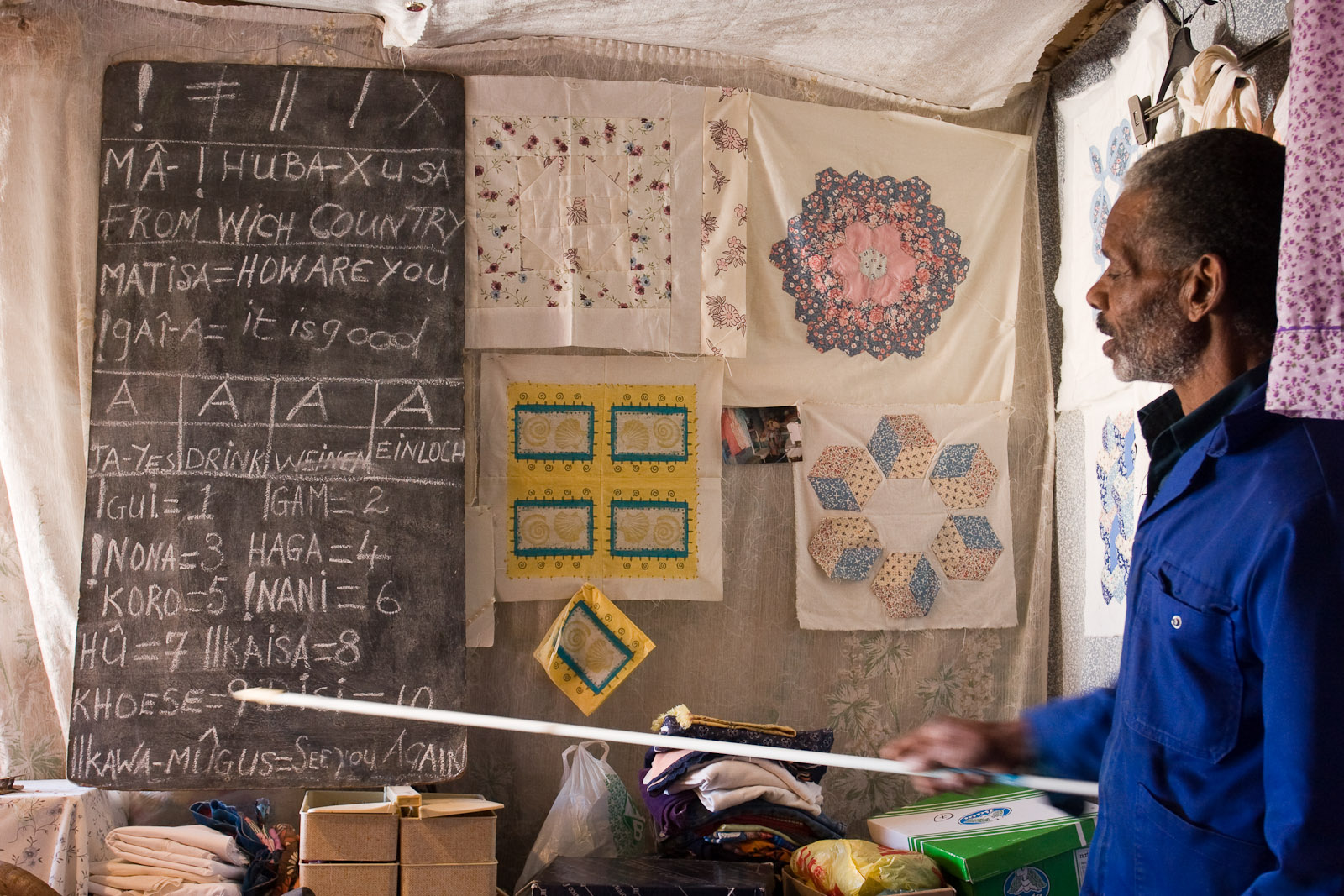
Nama man giving lessons on the Khoekhoe language

=== Vowels ===
There are 5 vowel qualities, found as oral /i e a o u/ and nasal /ĩ ã ũ/. /u/ is strongly rounded, /o/ only slightly so. /a/ is the only vowel with notable allophony; it is pronounced [ə] before /i/ or /u/.

=== Tone ===
Nama has been described as having three or four tones, /á, ā, à/ or /a̋, á, à, ȁ/, which may occur on each mora (vowels and final nasal consonants). The high tone is higher when it occurs on one of the high vowels (/í ú/) or on a nasal (/ń ḿ/) than on mid or low vowels (/é á ó/).

The tones combine into a limited number of 'tone melodies' (word tones), which have sandhi forms in certain syntactic environments. The most important melodies, in their citation and main sandhi forms, are as follows:

Citation	Sandhi	Meaning	Melody
ǃ̃ˀȍm̀s	ǃ̃ˀòm̏s	butting, hitting s.t.	low
ǃ̃ˀȍḿs		an udder	low rising
ǃ̃ˀòm̀s		forcing out of a burrow	mid
ǃ̃ˀòm̋s	ǃ̃ˀòm̀s	a pollard	high rising
ǃ̃ˀóm̀s	ǃ̃ˀòm̏s	coagulating, prizing out [a thorn]	low falling
ǃ̃ˀőḿs	ǃ̃ˀóm̀s	a fist	high falling

=== Stress ===
Within a phrase, lexical words receive greater stress than grammatical words. Within a word, the first syllable receives the most stress. Subsequent syllables receive less and less stress and are spoken more and more quickly.

=== Consonants ===
Nama has 31 consonants: 20 clicks and only 11 non-clicks.

==== Pulmonic consonants ====
Orthography in brackets.

	Bilabial	Alveolar	Velar	Glottal
Nasal	m ⟨m⟩	n ⟨n⟩		
Plosive	p ~ β ⟨b/p⟩	t ~ ɾ ⟨t/d/r⟩	k ⟨k/g⟩	ʔ ⟨-⟩
Affricate		t͜sʰ ⟨ts⟩	k͜xʰ ⟨kh⟩	
Fricative		s ⟨s⟩	x ⟨x⟩	h ⟨h⟩

Between vowels, /p/ is pronounced [β] and /t/ is pronounced [ɾ]. The affricate series is strongly aspirated, and may be analysed phonemically as aspirated stops; in the related Korana they are [tʰ, kʰ].

==== Ejective consonant ====
Beach (1938) reported that the Khoekhoe of the time had a velar lateral ejective affricate, [k𝼄ʼ], a common realisation or allophone of /kxʼ/ in languages with clicks. This sound no longer occurs in Khoekhoe but remains in its cousin Korana.

==== Click consonants ====
The clicks are doubly articulated consonants. Each click consists of one of four primary articulations or "influxes" and one of five secondary articulation or "effluxes". The combination results in 20 phonemes.

accompaniment	affricated clicks		'sharp' clicks		standardised orthography
accompaniment	dental clicks	lateral clicks	alveolar clicks	palatal clicks	standardised orthography
Tenuis	ᵏǀ	ᵏǁ	ᵏǃ	ᵏǂ	⟨ǃg⟩
Aspirated	ᵏǀʰ	ᵏǁʰ	ᵏǃʰ	ᵏǂʰ	⟨ǃkh⟩
Nasal	ᵑǀ	ᵑǁ	ᵑǃ	ᵑǂ	⟨ǃn⟩
Aspirated nasal	ᵑ̊ǀʰ	ᵑ̊ǁʰ	ᵑ̊ǃʰ	ᵑ̊ǂʰ	⟨ǃh⟩
Glottalized nasal	ᵑ̊ǀˀ	ᵑ̊ǁˀ	ᵑ̊ǃˀ	ᵑ̊ǂˀ	⟨ǃ⟩

The aspiration on the aspirated clicks is often light but is 'raspier' than the aspirated nasal clicks, with a sound approaching the ch of Scottish loch. The glottalized clicks are clearly voiceless due to the hold before the release, and they are transcribed as simple voiceless clicks in the traditional orthography. The nasal component is not audible in initial position; the voiceless nasal component of the aspirated clicks is also difficult to hear when not between vowels, so to foreign ears, it may sound like a longer but less raspy version of the contour clicks.

Wesleyan missionary Henry Tindall notes that European learners "almost invariably" pronounce the lateral clicks by placing the tongue against the side teeth and that this articulation is "harsh and foreign to the native ear". The Nama instead cover the whole of the palate with the tongue and produce the sound "as far back in the palate as possible".

=== Phonotactics ===
Lexical root words consist of two or rarely three moras, in the form CVCV(C), CVV(C), or CVN(C). (The initial consonant is required.) The middle consonant may only be w r m n (w is b~p and r is d~t), while the final consonant (C) may only be p, s, ts. Each mora carries tone, but the second may only be high or medium, for six tone "melodies": HH, MH, LH, HM, MM, LM.

Oral vowel sequences in CVV are /ii ee aa oo uu ai [əi] ae ao au [əu] oa oe ui/. Due to the reduced number of nasal vowels, nasal sequences are /ĩĩ ãã ũũ ãĩ [ə̃ĩ] ãũ [ə̃ũ] õã ũĩ/. Sequences ending in a high vowel (/ii uu ai au ui ĩĩ ũũ ãĩ ãũ ũĩ/) are pronounced more quickly than others (/ee aa oo ae ao oa oe ãã õã/), more like diphthongs and long vowels than like vowel sequences in hiatus. The tones are realised as contours. CVCV words tend to have the same vowel sequences, though there are many exceptions. The two tones are also more distinct.

Vowel-nasal sequences are restricted to non-front vowels: /am an om on um un/. Their tones are also realised as contours.

Grammatical particles have the form CV or CN, with any vowel or tone, where C may be any consonant but a click, and the latter cannot be NN. Suffixes and a third mora of a root, may have the form CV, CN, V, N, with any vowel or tone; there are also three C-only suffixes, -p 1m.sg, -ts 2m.sg, -s 2/3f.sg.

== Orthography ==
There have been several orthographies used for Nama. A Khoekhoegowab dictionary (Haacke 2000) uses the modern standard.

In standard orthography, the consonants b d g are used for words with one of the lower tone melodies and p t k for one of the higher tone melodies; they are otherwise pronounced the same. W is only used between vowels, though it may be replaced with b or p according to tone. Overt tone-marking is otherwise generally omitted.

Orthography	Transcription	Melody	Meaning
gao	/kȁó/	low rising	'rule'
kao	/kàő/	high rising	'be dumbfounded'
ǀhubu (or ǀhuwu)	/ǀʰȕwú/	low rising	'to stop hurting'
ǀhupu (or ǀhuwu)	/ǀʰùwű/	high rising	'to get out of breath'

Nasal vowels are written with a circumflex. All nasal vowels are long, as in hû /hũ̀ṹ/ 'seven'. Long (double) vowels are otherwise written with a macron, as in ā /ʔàa̋/ 'to cry, weep'; these constitute two moras (two tone-bearing units).

A glottal stop is not written at the beginning of a word (where it is predictable), but it is transcribed with a hyphen in compound words, such as gao-aob /kȁòʔòȁp/ 'chief'.

The clicks are written with the Lepsius letters that were later adopted as IPA symbols. The basic (tenuis) clicks are:

- ǀg (a single pipe) for a dental click
- ǁg (a double pipe) for a lateral click
- ǃg (a pipe with an under-dot, approximately an exclamation mark) for an alveolar click
- ǂg (a pipe with a double cross stroke) for a palatal click

Sometimes ASCII characters are substituted, e.g. the hash (#) in place of ǂ.

== Grammar ==
Nama has a subject–object–verb word order, three nouns classes (masculine/gu-class, feminine/di-class and neuter/n-class) and three grammatical numbers (singular, dual and plural). Pronominal enclitics are used to mark person, gender, and number on the noun phrases.

	Singular	Dual	Plural	Gloss
Feminine/Di-class	Piris	Pirira	Piridi	goat
Masculine/Gu-class	Arib	Arikha	Arigu	dog
Neutral/N-class	Khoe-i	Khoera	Khoen	people

=== Person, gender and number markers ===
The PGN (person-gender-number) markers are enclitic pronouns that attach to noun phrases. The PGN markers distinguish first, second, and third person, masculine, feminine, and neuter gender, and singular, dual, and plural number. The PGN markers can be divided into nominative, object, and oblique paradigms.

==== Nominative ====
	Masculine			Feminine			Neuter		
Person	1	2	3	1	2	3	1	2	3
Singular	ta	ts	b/mi/ni	ta	s	s	—	—	-i
Dual	khom	kho	kha	m	ro	ra	m	ro	re
Plural	ge	go	gu	se	so	di	da	du	n

==== Object ====
(PGN + i)

	Masculine			Feminine			Neuter		
Person	1	2	3	1	2	3	1	2	3
Singular	te	tsi	bi/mi/ni	te	si	si	—	—	-i
Dual	khom	kho	kha	mi/im	ro	ra	mi/im	ro	ra
Plural	ge	go	gu	se	so	di	da	du	ni/in

==== Oblique ====
(PGN + a)

	Masculine			Feminine			Neuter		
Person	1	2	3	1	2	3	1	2	3
Singular	ta	tsa	ba/ma/na	ta	sa	sa	—	—	-e
Dual	khoma	kho	kha	ma	ro	ra	mo	ro	ra
Plural	ge	go	ga	se	so	de	da	do	na

=== Articles ===
Khoekhoe has four definite articles: ti, si, sa, ǁî. These definite articles can be combined with PGN markers.

Examples from Haacke (2013):

- si-khom "we two males" (someone other than addressee and I)
- sa-khom "we two males" (addressee and I)
- ǁî-khom "we two males" (someone else referred to previously and I)

ti	si	sa	ǁî
+definite	+definite	+definite	+definite
+speaker	+speaker	+addressee	+discussed
+human	-addressee	+human
+singular	+human
	-singular

=== Clause headings ===
There are three clause markers, ge (declarative), kha (interrogative), and ko/km (assertive). These markers appear in matrix clauses, and appear after the subject.

== Sample text ==
Following is a sample text in the Khoekhoe language.

Nē ǀkharib ǃnâ da ge ǁGûn tsî ǀGaen tsî doan tsîn; tsî ǀNopodi tsî ǀKhenadi tsî ǀhuigu tsî ǀAmin tsîn; tsî !kharagagu ǀaon tsîna ra hō.

In this region, we find springbuck, oryx, and duiker; francolin, guinea fowl, bustard, and ostrich; and also various kinds of snake.

== Bibliography ==
- Khoekhoegowab/English for Children, Éditions du Cygne, 2013, ISBN 978-2-84924-309-1
- Beach, Douglas M. 1938. The Phonetics of the Hottentot Language. Cambridge: Heffer.
- Brugman, Johanna. 2009. Segments, Tones and Distribution in Khoekhoe Prosody. PhD Thesis, Cornell University.
- Haacke, Wilfrid. 1976. A Nama Grammar: The Noun-phrase. MA thesis. Cape Town: University of Cape Town.
- Haacke, Wilfrid H. G. 1977. "The So-called "Personal Pronoun" in Nama." In Traill, Anthony, ed., Khoisan Linguistic Studies 3, 43–62. Communications 6. Johannesburg: African Studies Institute, University of the Witwatersrand.
- Haacke, Wilfrid. 1978. Subject Deposition in Nama. MA thesis. Colchester, UK: University of Essex.
- Haacke, Wilfrid. 1992. "Compound Noun Phrases in Nama". In Gowlett, Derek F., ed., African Linguistic Contributions (Festschrift Ernst Westphal), 189–194. Pretoria: Via Afrika.
- Haacke, Wilfrid. 1992. "Dislocated Noun Phrases in Khoekhoe (Nama/Damara): Further Evidence for the Sentential Hypothesis". Afrikanistische Arbeitspapiere, 29, 149–162.
- Haacke, Wilfrid. 1995. "Instances of Incorporation and Compounding in Khoekhoegowab (Nama/Damara)". In Anthony Traill, Rainer Vossen and Marguerite Anne Megan Biesele, eds., The Complete Linguist: Papers in Memory of Patrick J. Dickens", 339–361. Cologne: Rüdiger Köppe Verlag.
- Haacke, Wilfrid; Eiseb, Eliphas and Namaseb, Levi. 1997. "Internal and External Relations of Khoekhoe Dialects: A Preliminary Survey". In Wilfrid Haacke & Edward D. Elderkin, eds., Namibian Languages: Reports and Papers, 125–209. Cologne: Rüdiger Köppe Verlag for the University of Namibia.
- Haacke, Wilfrid. 1999. The Tonology of Khoekhoe (Nama/Damara). Quellen zur Khoisan-Forschung/Research in Khoisan Studies, Bd 16. Cologne: Rüdiger Köppe Verlag.
- Haacke, Wilfrid H.G. & Eiseb, Eliphas. 2002. A Khoekhoegowab Dictionary with an English-Khoekhoegowab Index. Windhoek : Gamsberg Macmillan. ISBN 99916-0-401-4
- Hagman, Roy S. 1977. Nama Hottentot Grammar. Language Science Monographs, v 15. Bloomington: Indiana University.
- Krönlein, Johann Georg. 1889. Wortschatz der Khoi-Khoin (Namaqua-Hottentotten). Berlin : Deutsche Kolonialgesellschaft.
- Olpp, Johannes. 1977. Nama-grammatika. Windhoek : Inboorlingtaalburo van die Departement van Bantoe-onderwys.
- Rust, Friedrich. 1965. Praktische Namagrammatik. Cape Town : Balkema.
- Vossen, Rainer. 2013. The Khoesan Languages. Oxon: Routledge.
