= Nasal palatal click =

Consonantal sound

ǂ̃ 𝼋̃

Nasal palatal velar click

ŋǂ ŋ𝼋

ᵑǂ ᵑ𝼋

Nasal palatal uvular click

ɴǂ ɴ𝼋

ᶰǂ ᶰ𝼋

A palatal nasal click is a click consonant found primarily among the languages of southern Africa. The symbol in the International Phonetic Alphabet for a nasal palatal click with a velar rear articulation is ⟨ŋ͡ǂ⟩ or ⟨ŋ͜ǂ⟩, commonly abbreviated to ⟨ŋǂ⟩, ⟨ᵑǂ⟩ or ⟨ǂ̃⟩. Linguists who prefer the old IPA letters use the analogous Beach convention of ⟨ŋ͡𝼋⟩ or ⟨ŋ͜𝼋⟩, abbreviated ⟨ŋ𝼋⟩, ⟨ᵑ𝼋⟩ or ⟨𝼋̃⟩. For a click with a uvular rear articulation, the equivalents are ⟨ɴ͡ǂ, ɴ͜ǂ, ɴǂ, ᶰǂ⟩ and ⟨ɴ͡𝼋, ɴ͜𝼋, ɴ𝼋, ᶰ𝼋⟩. Sometimes the accompanying letter comes after the click letter, e.g. ⟨ǂŋ⟩ or ⟨ǂᵑ⟩; this may be a simple orthographic choice, or may imply a difference in the relative timing of the releases.

== Features ==
Features of a palatal nasal click:

- The airstream mechanism is lingual ingressive (also known as velaric ingressive), which means a pocket of air trapped between two closures is rarefied by a "sucking" action of the tongue, rather than being moved by the glottis or the lungs/diaphragm. The release of the forward closure produces the "click" sound. Voiced and nasal clicks have a simultaneous pulmonic egressive airstream.
- Its place of articulation is palatal, which means it is articulated with the middle or back part of the tongue raised to the hard palate.
- Its phonation is voiced, which means the vocal cords vibrate during the articulation.
- It is a nasal consonant, which means air is exclusively allowed to escape through the nose for nasal stops; otherwise, in addition to through the mouth.
- It is a median consonant, which means it is produced by directing the airstream down the midline of the tongue, rather than to the sides.

== Occurrence ==
Palatal nasal clicks are only found in the various Khoisan languages families of southern Africa and in the neighboring Yeyi language.

Language	Word	IPA	Meaning
Khoekhoe	ǂnauǃhuiǂgui	[ᵑǂə̀űᵑ̊ǃʰȕíᵏǂȕí] = [ᵑ𝼋ə̀űᵑ̊ǃʰȕíᵏ𝼋ȕí]	to give s.o. a bloody nose
Naro	ntcùú qhuri c’õa (nçùú qhuri c’õa)	[ᵑǂǔːǃʰūɾīŋǀˀõ̯ã] = [ᵑ𝼋ǔːʗʰūɾīŋʇˀõ̯ã]	the Milky Way
Taa	ǂnûm	[ᵑǂûm] = [ᵑ𝼋ûm]	two
Gǀui		[ᵑǂâː] = [ᵑ𝼋âː]	to stare
Tumʔi	seinǂama	[seiᵑǂama] = [seiᵑ𝼋ama]	crush

== Glottalized palatal nasal click ==
Glottalized palatal nasal click

ǂ̃ˀ

ᵑǂʔ

ᵑ̊ǂˀ

ᵑǂˀ

All Khoisan languages, and a few Bantu languages, have glottalized nasal clicks. These are formed by closing the glottis so that the click is pronounced in silence; however, any preceding vowel will be nasalized.

Language	Word	IPA	Meaning
Khoekhoe	ǂamǁgû	[ᵑǂ͡ʔàm̀ᵏǁṹṹ] = [ᵑ𝼋ˀàm̀ᵏʖṹṹ]	to inadvertently bite a hard object
Naro	tc’úú-tc’ùù (ç’úú-ç’ùù)	[ᵑǂˀúːŋǂˀùː]	to paint
Gǀui		[ᵑǂ͡ʔáː] = [ᵑ𝼋ˀáː]	to hide (oneself)
Yeyi		[makʰweᵑǂˀumu]	sunrise

Place →	Labial					Coronal										Dorsal					Laryngeal			
Manner ↓	Bilabial		Labiodental		Linguolabial		Dental		Alveolar		Postalveolar		Retroflex		(Alveolo-)palatal		Velar		Uvular		Pharyngeal/epiglottal		Glottal	
Nasal	m̥	m	ɱ̊	ɱ		n̼	n̪̊	n̪	n̥	n	n̠̊	n̠	ɳ̊	ɳ	ɲ̊	ɲ	ŋ̊	ŋ	ɴ̥	ɴ				
Plosive	p	b	p̪	b̪	t̼	d̼	t̪	d̪	t	d			ʈ	ɖ	c	ɟ	k	ɡ	q	ɢ	ʡ		ʔ	
Sibilant affricate							t̪s̪	d̪z̪	ts	dz	t̠ʃ	d̠ʒ	tʂ	dʐ	tɕ	dʑ								
Non-sibilant affricate	pɸ	bβ	p̪f	b̪v			t̪θ	d̪ð	tɹ̝̊	dɹ̝	t̠ɹ̠̊˔	d̠ɹ̠˔			cç	ɟʝ	kx	ɡɣ	qχ	ɢʁ	ʡʜ	ʡʢ	ʔh	
Sibilant fricative							s̪	z̪	s	z	ʃ	ʒ	ʂ	ʐ	ɕ	ʑ								
Non-sibilant fricative	ɸ	β	f	v	θ̼	ð̼	θ	ð	θ̠	ð̠	ɹ̠̊˔	ɹ̠˔	ɻ̊˔	ɻ˔	ç	ʝ	x	ɣ	χ	ʁ	ħ	ʕ	h	ɦ
Approximant		β̞		ʋ				ð̞		ɹ		ɹ̠		ɻ		j		ɰ						˷
Tap/flap		ⱱ̟		ⱱ					ɾ̥	ɾ			ɽ̊	ɽ						ɢ̆		ʡ̮		
Trill	ʙ̥	ʙ							r̥	r		r̠	ɽ̊r̥	ɽr					ʀ̥	ʀ	ʜ	ʢ		
Lateral affricate									tɬ	dɮ			tꞎ	d𝼅	c𝼆	ɟʎ̝	k𝼄	ɡʟ̝						
Lateral fricative							ɬ̪		ɬ	ɮ			ꞎ	𝼅	𝼆	ʎ̝	𝼄	ʟ̝						
Lateral approximant								l̪	l̥	l		l̠	ɭ̊	ɭ	ʎ̥	ʎ	ʟ̥	ʟ		ʟ̠				
Lateral tap/flap									ɺ̥	ɺ			𝼈̊	𝼈		ʎ̮		ʟ̆						

		BL	LD	D	A	PA	RF	P	V	U
Implosive	Voiced	ɓ			ɗ		ᶑ	ʄ	ɠ	ʛ
Implosive	Voiceless	ɓ̥			ɗ̥		ᶑ̊	ʄ̊	ɠ̊	ʛ̥
Ejective	Stop	pʼ			tʼ		ʈʼ	cʼ	kʼ	qʼ
Ejective	Affricate		p̪fʼ	t̪θʼ	tsʼ	t̠ʃʼ	tʂʼ	tɕʼ	kxʼ	qχʼ
Ejective	Fricative	ɸʼ	fʼ	θʼ	sʼ	ʃʼ	ʂʼ	ɕʼ	xʼ	χʼ
Ejective	Lateral affricate				tɬʼ			c𝼆ʼ	k𝼄ʼ	q𝼄ʼ
Ejective	Lateral fricative				ɬʼ					
Click (top: velar; bottom: uvular)	Tenuis	kʘ qʘ		kǀ qǀ	kǃ qǃ		k𝼊 q𝼊	kǂ qǂ		
Click (top: velar; bottom: uvular)	Voiced	ɡʘ ɢʘ		ɡǀ ɢǀ	ɡǃ ɢǃ		ɡ𝼊 ɢ𝼊	ɡǂ ɢǂ		
Click (top: velar; bottom: uvular)	Nasal	ŋʘ ɴʘ		ŋǀ ɴǀ	ŋǃ ɴǃ		ŋ𝼊 ɴ𝼊	ŋǂ ɴǂ	ʞ	
Click (top: velar; bottom: uvular)	Tenuis lateral				kǁ qǁ					
Click (top: velar; bottom: uvular)	Voiced lateral				ɡǁ ɢǁ					
Click (top: velar; bottom: uvular)	Nasal lateral				ŋǁ ɴǁ					
