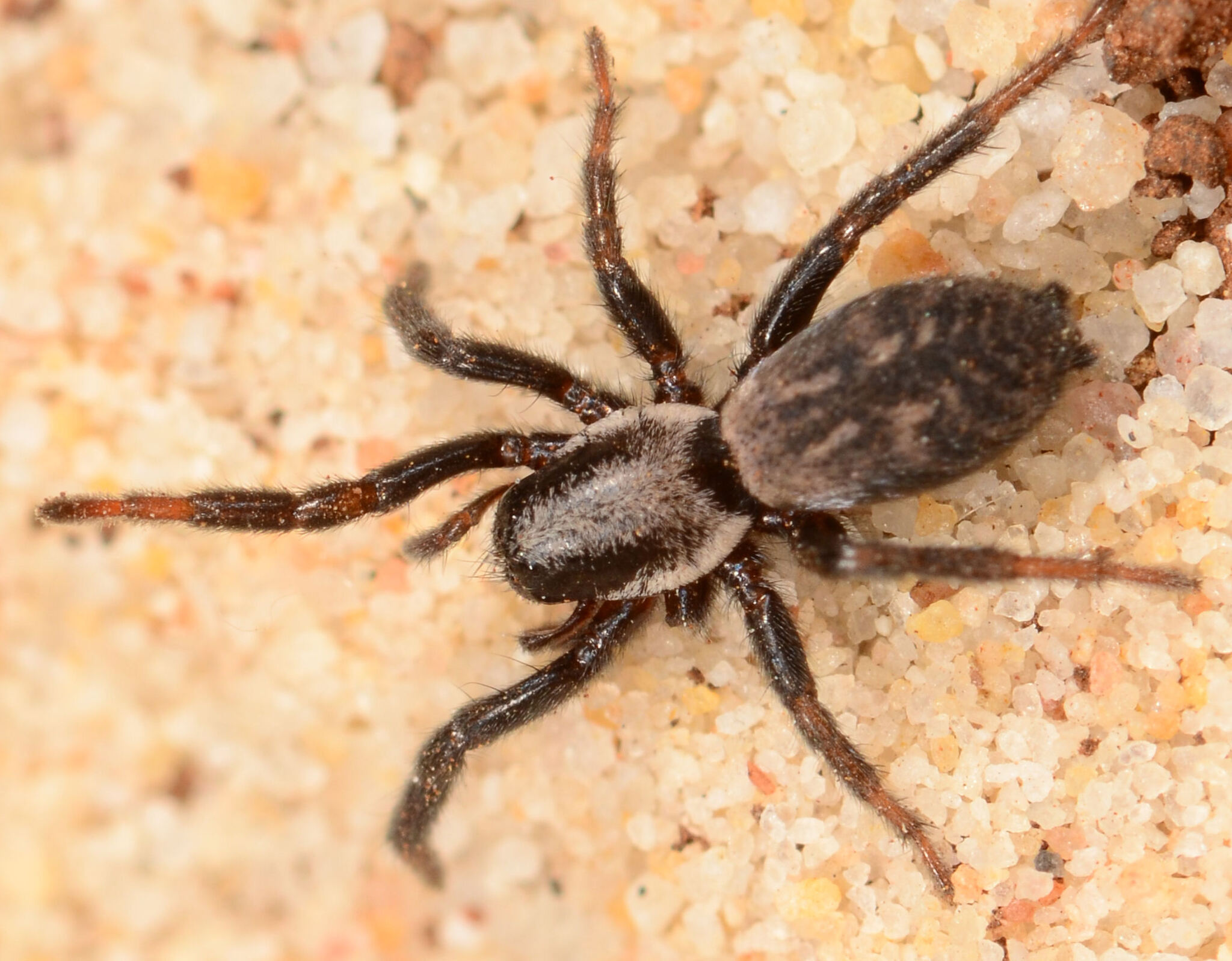
- female T. kannemeyeri
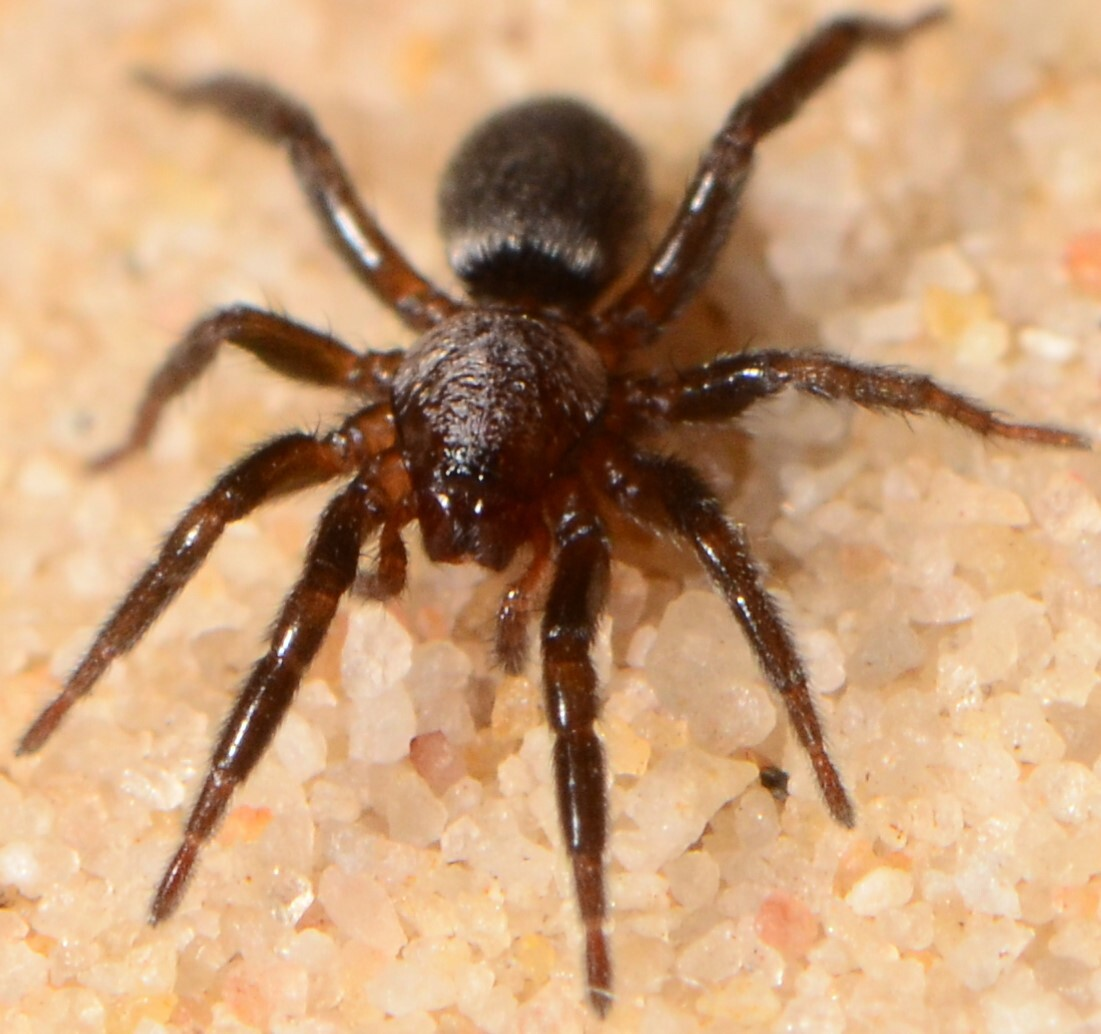
- T. parvipalpa

Scientific classification
- Kingdom: Animalia
- Phylum: Arthropoda
- Subphylum: Chelicerata
- Class: Arachnida
- Order: Araneae
- Infraorder: Araneomorphae
- Family: Gnaphosidae
- Genus: Trephopoda; Tucker, 1923

Type species
- T. hanoveria Tucker, 1923

Species
- 6, see text

Synonyms
- Upognampa Tucker, 1923

= Trephopoda =

Genus of spiders

Trephopoda is a genus of southern African ground spiders first described by R.W.E. Tucker in 1923. They have only been found in Botswana, Namibia and South Africa.

== Species ==
As of September 2025, this genus includes 6 species:

- Trephopoda aplanita (Tucker, 1923) – South Africa
- Trephopoda biamenta (Tucker, 1923) – South Africa
- Trephopoda ctenipalpis (Lawrence, 1927) – Namibia
- Trephopoda hanoveria Tucker, 1923 – South Africa (type species)
- Trephopoda kannemeyeri (Tucker, 1923) – South Africa
- Trephopoda parvipalpa (Tucker, 1923) – Botswana, South Africa

Formerly included:

- T. lineatipes (Purcell, 1908) (Transferred to Smionia)
