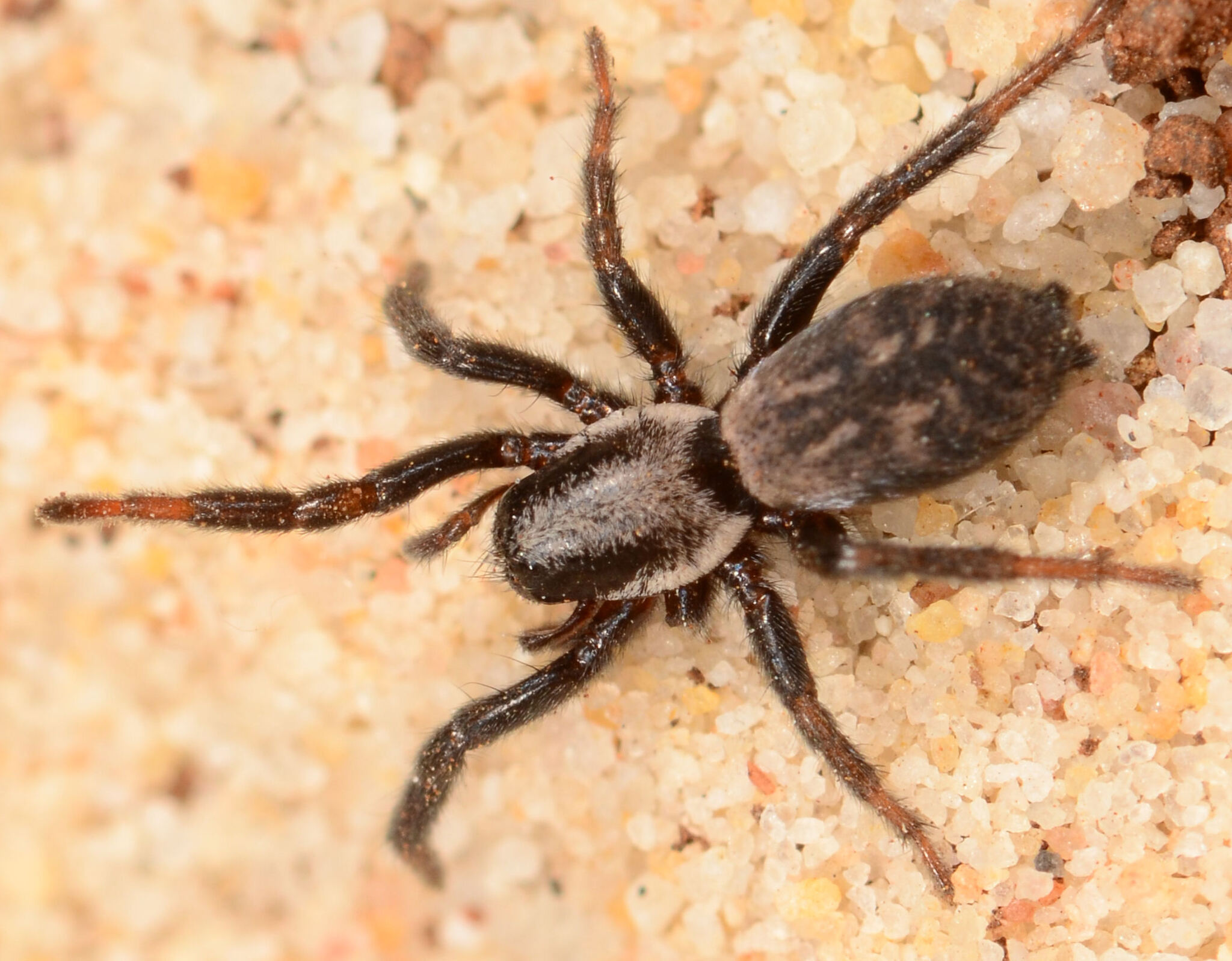
- female
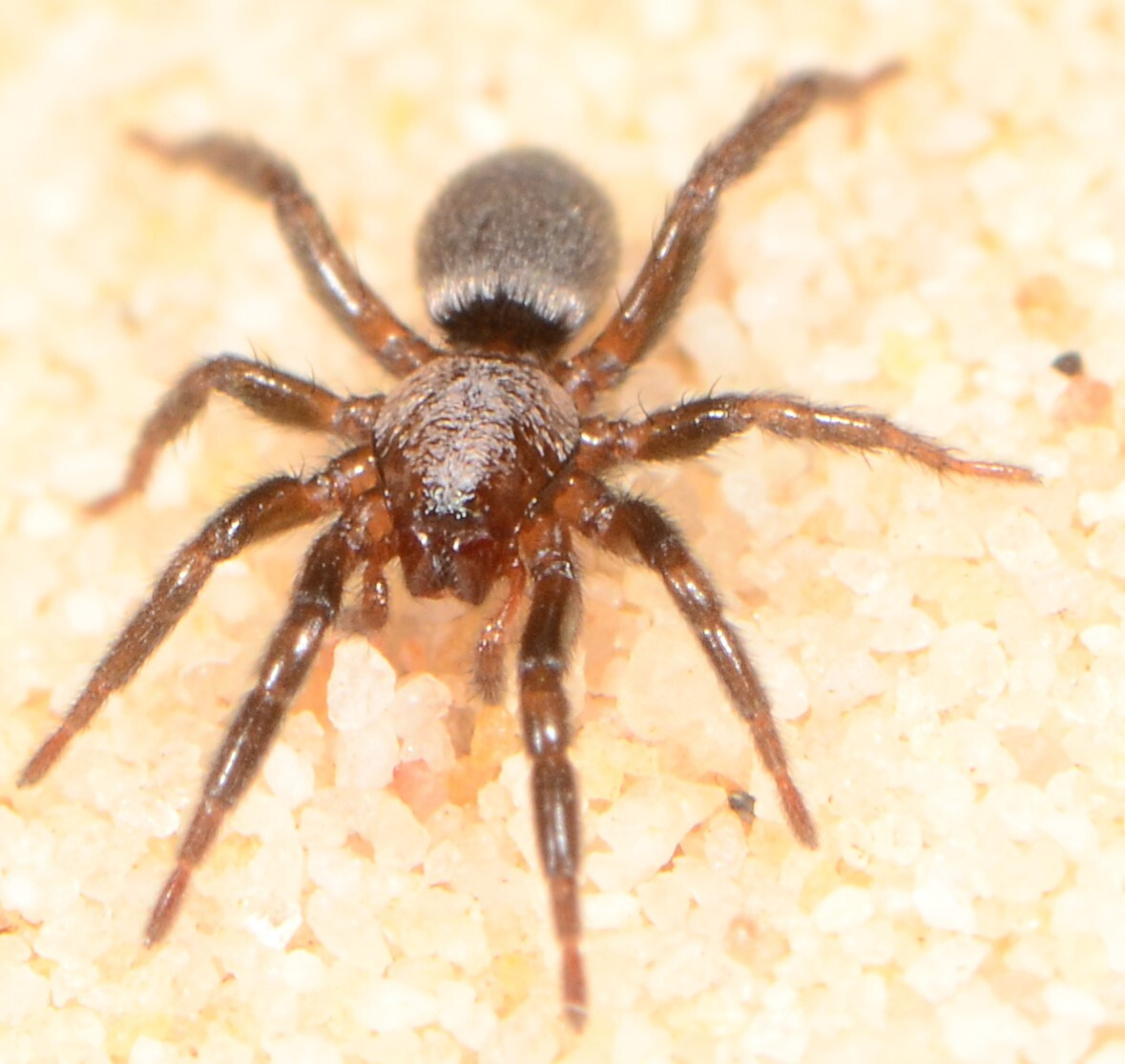
- female

Scientific classification
- Kingdom: Animalia
- Phylum: Arthropoda
- Subphylum: Chelicerata
- Class: Arachnida
- Order: Araneae
- Infraorder: Araneomorphae
- Family: Gnaphosidae
- Genus: Trephopoda
- Species: T. kannemeyeri

Binomial name
- Trephopoda kannemeyeri (Tucker, 1923)

Synonyms
- Upognampa kannemeyeri Tucker, 1923

= Trephopoda kannemeyeri =

Kannemeyer's Trephopoda Ground Spider

Species of spider

Trephopoda kannemeyeri is a spider species in the family Gnaphosidae. It is endemic to southern Africa and is commonly known as Kannemeyer's Trephopoda ground spider.

== Distribution ==
Trephopoda kannemeyeri has a wide distribution across South Africa, occurring in five provinces: Eastern Cape, Free State, Gauteng, Northern Cape, and Western Cape. Notable locations include Grahamstown, Smithfield (the type locality), Pretoria, and Bontebok National Park. The species occurs at altitudes ranging from 60 to 2,598 m above sea level.

== Habitat and ecology ==
The species is a free-living ground dweller found in Grassland, Nama Karoo, and Savanna biomes.

== Description ==
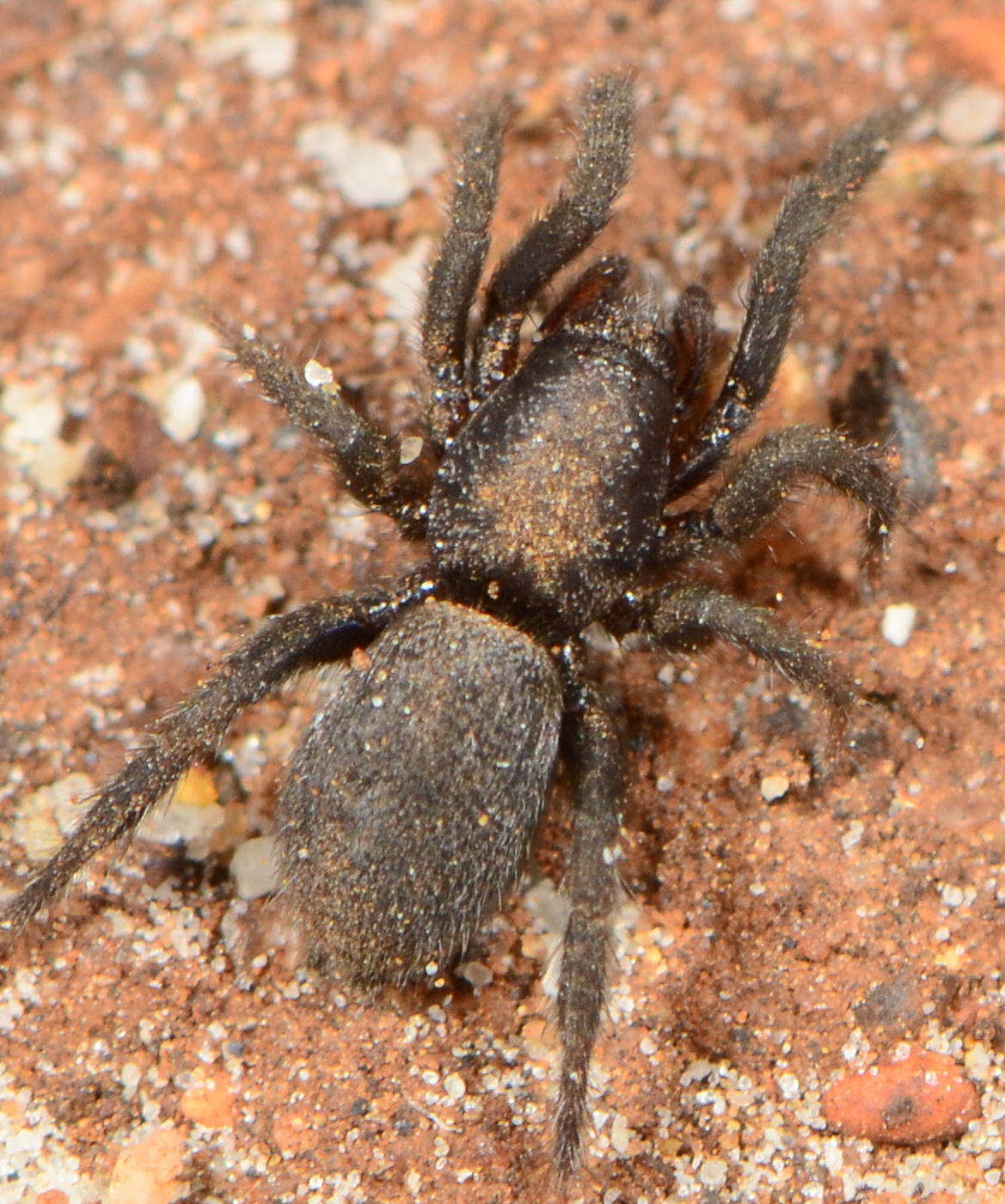
female

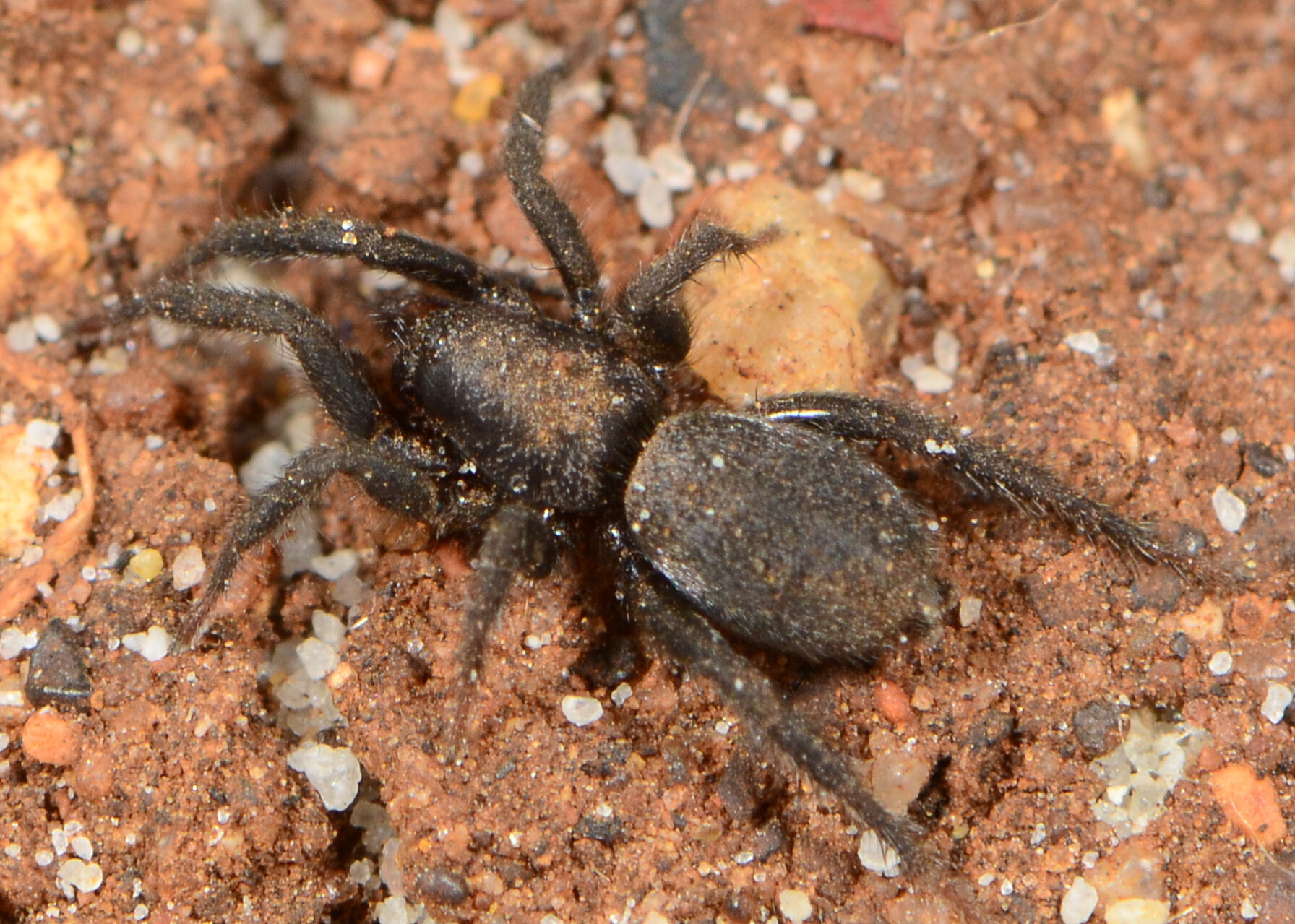
female

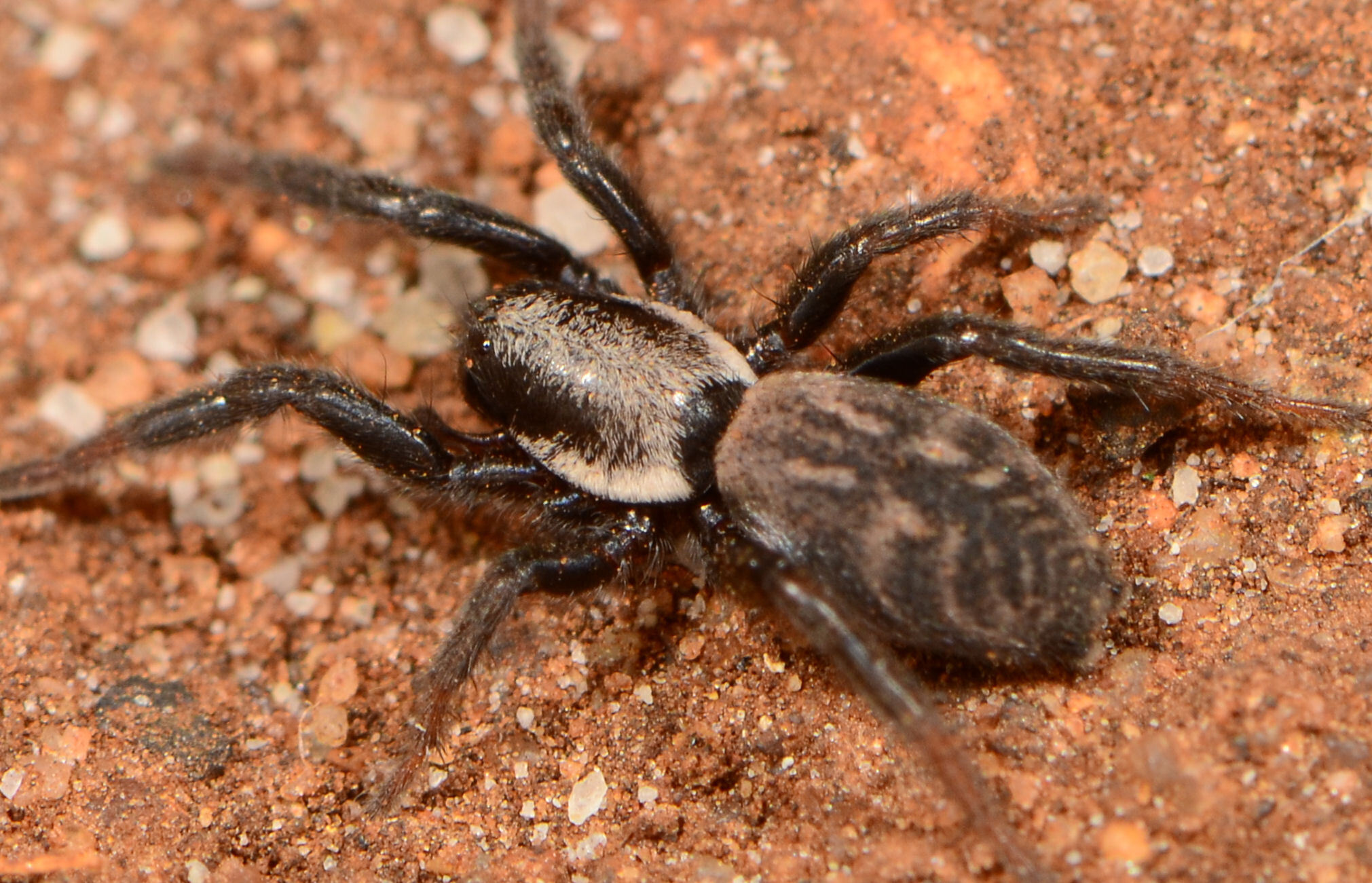
female

Females have a carapace that is light to medium brown, tinged with red anteriorly, with lateral margins slightly darkened and the surface clothed with sparse pubescence. The abdomen is dull testaceous, slightly darkened, and bears indistinct chevron-like markings posteriorly on the dorsal surface.

== Conservation ==
Trephopoda kannemeyeri is listed as Least Concern by the South African National Biodiversity Institute due to its wide range across multiple provinces. The species is protected in eight protected areas.

== Taxonomy ==
The species was originally described by Tucker in 1923 as Upognampa kannemeyeri from Smithfield in the Free State. Murphy provided drawings of the species in 2007. Unlike many other Trephopoda species, both males and females are known.
