= Smionia capensis =

Scientific classification
- Kingdom: Animalia
- Phylum: Arthropoda
- Subphylum: Chelicerata
- Class: Arachnida
- Order: Araneae
- Infraorder: Araneomorphae
- Family: Gnaphosidae
- Genus: Smionia
- Species: S. capensis

Binomial name
- Smionia capensis Dalmas, 1920

Species of spider

Smionia capensis is a species of spider in the family Gnaphosidae. It is endemic to South Africa.

== Distribution ==
Smionia capensis is known only from the Cape of Good Hope region, with the type locality given only as "Cap de Bonne-Esperance".

== Habitat and ecology ==
The species is a free-living ground dweller.

== Conservation ==
Smionia capensis is listed as Data Deficient for taxonomic reasons by the South African National Biodiversity Institute as too little is known about the location, distribution and threats of this taxon for an assessment to be made. The placement of the species is problematic and more sampling is needed.

== Etymology ==
The species name capensis refers to the Cape of Good Hope region where it was discovered.

== Taxonomy ==
The species was described by Dalmas in 1920 with the type locality given only as "Cap de Bonne-Esperance". It is known only from the female and its taxonomic placement remains problematic.
