= Dricky Beukes =

South African writer (1918–1999)

- Born: Hendrika Johanna van Staden; 29 December 1918; Prieska, Northern Cape
- Died: 9 November 1999 (aged 80)
- Occupation: Writer

Dricky Beukes (29 December 1918 – 9 November 1999) was a South African writer of Afrikaans novels, short stories and radio dramas. Beukes wrote more than a hundred Afrikaans novels, a large number of short stories and numerous Afrikaans radio dramas, including some extensive pieces for the commercial station Springbok Radio. She died in 1999 in Bellville after a battle with blood cancer. There is a Dricky Beukes Street named after her in Kokrus, Vereeniging.

== Early life ==
Hendrika Johanna van Staden was born on Seekoebaard farm in Prieska, Northern Cape, 29 December 1918. She was the youngest of 13 children. When she was three years old, her father moved their family to Karos, a small town near the Gariep River in Upington in the Northern Cape, where she grew up and received her early school education. She matriculated from the Higher Business School in Paarl and took up a job at the Karos Post Office after writing her Public Service Examination.

She married Abraham Opperman Beukes of Prince Albert on July 4, 1942. He was the first principal of Laerskool Vredelust in Bellville, who himself also wrote three children's books. The couple moved to Bellville and they had a son, Van Staden, and two daughters Brenda and Wilmari. In Bellville, Beukes was the editor for a small newspaper called Die Noordwester and a regular contributor to the Oudtshoorn Courant. After retirement, the couple settled in Tygerberg in Bellville. Beukes' husband died in Durbanville in March 1993.

== Work ==
Beukes was an accomplished writer and a host on the SABC's service Springbok radio. Beukes was made popular by her sequel stories. A phrase which gained country-wide popularity at the time was her introduction to the radio drama Die Indringer (The Trespasser): 'n verhaal wat elke moederhart sal roer (a story to touch the heart of every mother). Die Indringer was a story about the trials of a woman who adopted child. Die Indringer was broadcast for the first time on the May 16, 1960 and it was the most popular day program on Springbok radio for 11 years. Other popular radio stories by Dricky Beukes include Skaduwees oor Summerdown, Blinkwater, Die geel karavaan and Dokter Karenien. Beukes remained on air for more than a decade making her a household name in Afrikaans speaking homes.

She wrote her first novel, "Madelief", in just 14 days and it was published in 1945 in The Housewife. She was just 18 years old at the time. The story was inspired by her mother's death which occurred in the same year.

Beukes published many popular books in Afrikaans. The Kamberg series: "Kamberg se wêreld" (Kamberg's world), 1982, "Kamberg se mense" (Kamberg's people), 1986 and "Kamberg se Kinders" (Kamberg's children), 1988, were popular among readers. Beukes also wrote Meetsnoere and Een wat 'n muur afbreek. The stories depicted the lives of the people in Karos, where she spent her childhood.

== Bibliography ==
- (1946) Madelief
- (1947) Siel, jy het baie goed
- (1950) Karola
- (1952) Altyd jou eie, Langs 'n ompad, Ryp vrugte, Verbode paradys
- (1954) Belydenis, Gebarste mure
- (1956) Antwoord van 'n geslag
- (1958) Een bring die offer, Gebaande weë
- (1960) Uit die verre jare, Wie is my naaste?
- (1962) Dokter Nelia Eksteen
- (1964) Die indringer, 'n Seun vir Nebe
- (1966) Al lê die berge nog so blou, Deur liefde gebind, Die goue gety, Twee paaie, Verlore liefde
- (1968) Hoe groot die offer, Onbetaalde rekening
- (1970) Wie die liefde erf, Die wind waai waar hy wil
- (1972) Een van La Rhone, Ek was die vreemdeling
- (1974) Alsace en Lorraine, Ek het die wind gejaag, Die groot chirurg, Die jare roep
- (1976) Liefde van gister
- (1978) Anderkant die verste ster, Mevrou van Secunda, Nes tussen die sterre, Die smaad van Kroondal, Vaarwel ou Driefonteintjie, Omnibus: Dokter Nella Eksteen, Wie is my naaste, Die hoë muur
- (1980) Ken jy die vrou – deel 3, 'n Tyd vir stilstaan, Omnibus: Legkaart van die lewe, Moeder se dagboek, Waarmee sal ek versoening doen
- (1982) En more is nuut, Kamberg se wêreld, Die pad vorentoe, Roep van die Sonskynwoud, Omnibus (En môre is nuut): Die wind waai waar hy wil; Waar die winde, gaan rus het
- (1984) Alles net vir jou, Antwoord van die nageslag, Velde van offergawes, Waar die grootpad eindig
- (1986) Kamberg se mense, Die son sal weer skyn
- (1988) Kamberg se kinders, Die liefde loop 'n ompad
