= Trephopoda aplanita =

Conservation status
- Least Concern (SANBI Red List)

Scientific classification
- Kingdom: Animalia
- Phylum: Arthropoda
- Subphylum: Chelicerata
- Class: Arachnida
- Order: Araneae
- Infraorder: Araneomorphae
- Family: Gnaphosidae
- Genus: Trephopoda
- Species: T. aplanita

Binomial name
- Trephopoda aplanita (Tucker, 1923)

Species of spider

Trephopoda aplanita is a spider species in the family Gnaphosidae. It is endemic to South Africa.

== Distribution ==
Trephopoda aplanita is found across two South African provinces, the Free State and Western Cape. The species has a relatively wide distribution with locations including Bloemfontein, Table Mountain National Park, and De Hoop Nature Reserve. It occurs at altitudes ranging from 9 to 1,399 m above sea level.

== Habitat and ecology ==
The species is a free-living ground dweller that inhabits both Grassland and Fynbos biomes.

== Conservation ==
Trephopoda aplanita is listed as Least Concern by the South African National Biodiversity Institute due to its wide geographical range, despite being known only from females. The species is protected in several conservation areas including Amanzi Private Game Reserve, Erfenis Dam Nature Reserve, De Hoop Nature Reserve, and Table Mountain National Park.

== Taxonomy ==
The species was originally described by Tucker in 1923 as Upognampa aplanita from Bergvliet in the Western Cape. It was later transferred to the genus Trephopoda and revised by Murphy in 2007. Only the female is currently known.
