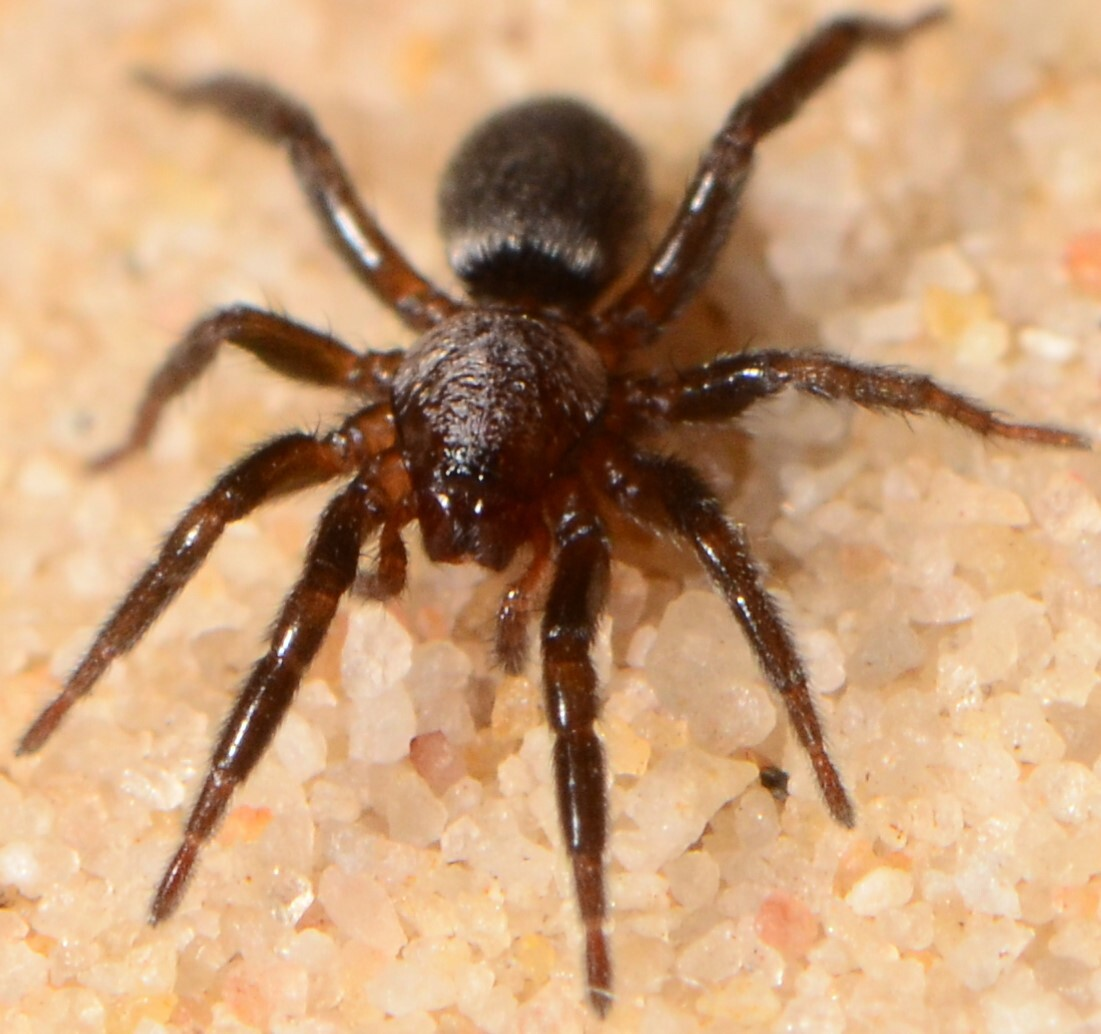
- female

Scientific classification
- Kingdom: Animalia
- Phylum: Arthropoda
- Subphylum: Chelicerata
- Class: Arachnida
- Order: Araneae
- Infraorder: Araneomorphae
- Family: Gnaphosidae
- Genus: Trephopoda
- Species: T. parvipalpa

Binomial name
- Trephopoda parvipalpa (Tucker, 1923)

= Trephopoda parvipalpa =

Trephopoda Ground Spider

Species of spider

Trephopoda parvipalpa is a spider species in the family Gnaphosidae. It occurs in southern Africa and is commonly known as the Trephopoda ground spider.

== Distribution ==
Trephopoda parvipalpa is found in Botswana and South Africa. In South Africa, it occurs across five provinces: KwaZulu-Natal, Limpopo, Mpumalanga, North West, and Western Cape. Notable locations include Matjiesfontein (the type locality), Table Mountain National Park, and various nature reserves.

== Habitat and ecology ==
The species is a free-living ground dweller found in Fynbos, Grassland, Nama Karoo, and Savanna biomes at altitudes ranging from 9 to 1,674 m above sea level. It has also been collected from cotton fields, indicating some tolerance for agricultural environments.

== Conservation ==
Trephopoda parvipalpa is listed as Least Concern by the South African National Biodiversity Institute. No significant threats to the species have been identified.

== Etymology ==
The species name parvipalpa refers to the small size of the pedipalps, from Latin parvus (small) and palpus (palp).

== Taxonomy ==
The species was originally described by Tucker in 1923 as Upognampa parvipalpa from Matjiesfontein in the Karoo. The species has not been revised since the original description and is known only from males.
