= Qasr Al-Eini Museum =

Historical medical museum in Cairo, Egypt

Coordinates: 30°01′50″N 31°13′41″E

The Qasr Al-Eini Museum is a historical medical museum in Cairo, Egypt.

The museum covers the history of medicine in the Arabic Mashriq region of the Levant, and the historical role played by the Qasr Al-Eini School of Medicine as a linkage between medicine in pharaonic Egypt and modern medicine.

A surgeon gynecologist and obstetrician named Dr. Mohammed Almenawi was the general secretary of the Faculty of Medicine. He came up with the idea of the Qasr Al-Eini Museum in 1976.

The library of the museum holds the following artifacts:

- rare books, references, documents, manuscripts, photographic pictures, and statues
- an encyclopedia on The Wise Men of Qasr Al-Eini or the biographies of 154 professors who lectured in Qasr Al-Eini
- an original copy of the book Description de l'Egypte

It is the first museum of an Arab University of Medicine, the Kasr El Aini Hospital, and represents the oldest University of Medicine in the Orient, the Qasr Al-Eini School of Medicine. The Qasr Al-Eini Museum's first phase of building opened in 1998, and a further section opened in 1999.
