= Sesfontein Damara =

Group of the Damara people residing around Sesfontein

The Sesfontein Damara are a group of the ǂNū-khoë (Damara) people residing around !Naniǀaus (Sesfontein) in northwestern Namibia. They are a subclan of the Damara tribe called Namidaman. Their dialect, considered to be quite conservative, differs greatly from other Damara dialects.
