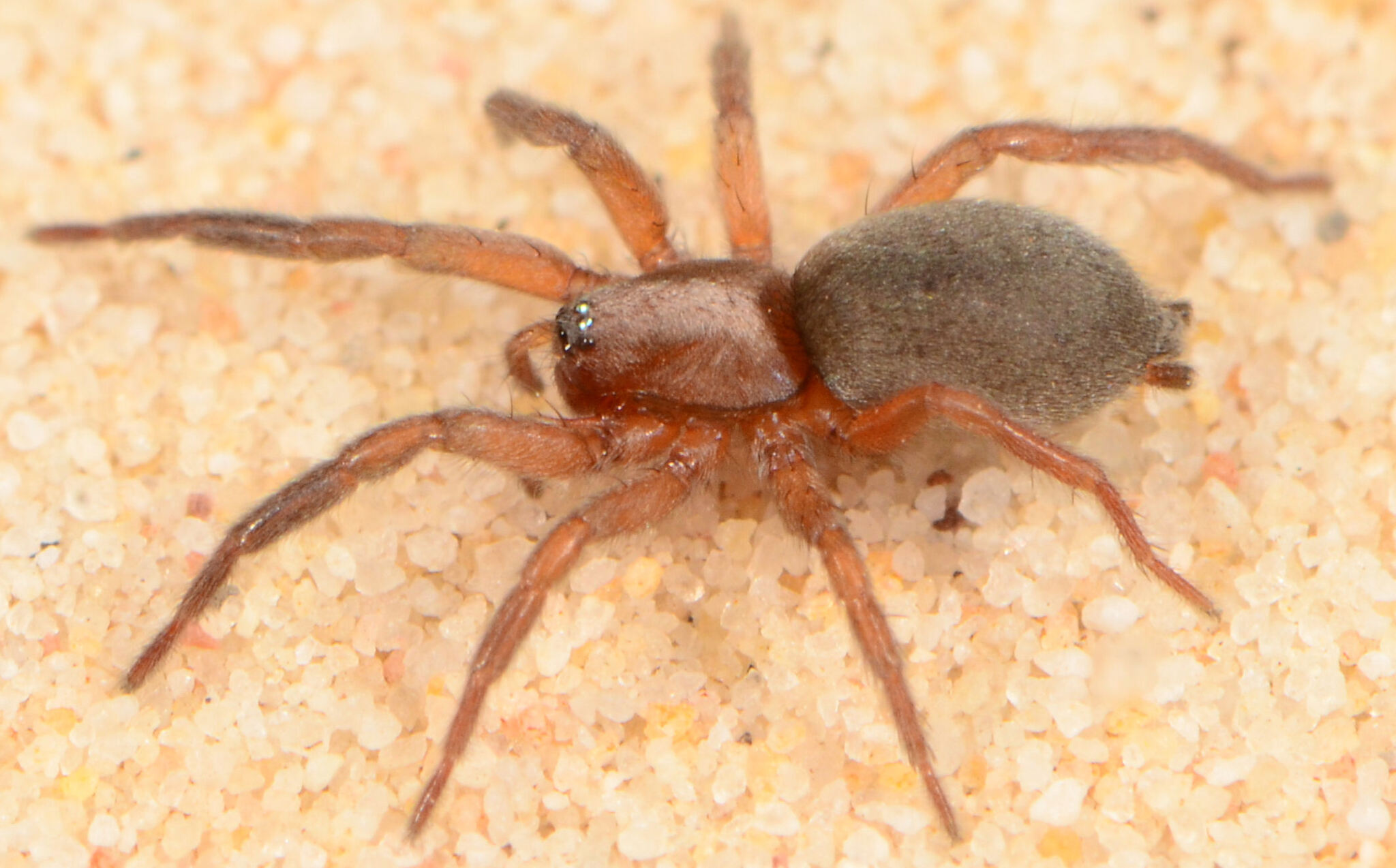
- juvenile female S. lineatipes

Scientific classification
- Kingdom: Animalia
- Phylum: Arthropoda
- Subphylum: Chelicerata
- Class: Arachnida
- Order: Araneae
- Infraorder: Araneomorphae
- Family: Gnaphosidae
- Genus: Smionia; Dalmas, 1920

Type species
- S. capensis Dalmas, 1920

Species
- S. capensis Dalmas, 1920; S. lineatipes (Purcell, 1908)

= Smionia =

Genus of spiders

Smionia is a genus of African ground spiders that was first described by R. de Dalmas in 1920.

== Species ==
As of September 2025, this genus includes two species:

- Smionia capensis Dalmas, 1920 – South Africa (type species)
- Smionia lineatipes (Purcell, 1908) – Cabo Verde, Botswana, Mozambique, South Africa
