= Eini dialect =

Extinct Khoekhoe dialect of South Africa

Eini
- Native to: South Africa
- Region: Orange River
- Era: attested 1936
- Language family: Khoe–Kwadi: Khoe; Khoekhoe; Khoekhoe; Eini

Language codes
- ISO 639-3: –
- Glottolog: eini1234

Eini (/ˈeɪniː/ AY-nee) is an extinct variety of Khoekhoe on the Orange River of South Africa, sometimes listed as a distinct language or mistakenly assumed to be a variety of ǃOra.
