= T. V. Bulpin =

South African writer

- Born: Thomas Victor Bulpin; 1918; Umkomaas, Kwazulu Natal
- Died: 1999 (aged 80–81)
- Writing career
- Genres: nonfiction, travel

Thomas Victor Bulpin (1918–1999) was a South African writer. He wrote 29 books and over 2,000 booklets, pamphlets, newspapers, magazine features, and travel videos. He wrote about African big-game hunters as well as South African travel and history. Most of his books are out of print. He was born in 1918 in Umkomaas, Kwazulu Natal. At the age of 16 he entered the cinema business as a technician, later enlisting with the South African Air force. He also joined the Associated British Cinema Corporation and was sent to cover Africa for their news reels. While traveling, he gathered information for his books. Later he began his own publishing company and focused on this and his travels until his death in 1999 at the age of 81, following a long battle with skin cancer. TV Bulpin is the author of Discovering Southern Africa and Tavern of the Seas.

== Selected works ==
- Discovering Southern Africa, 1980
- East Africa and the Islands, 1956
- Illustrated Guide to Southern Africa, 1980
- Islands in a Forgotten Sea, 1959
- Lost Trails on the Low Veld, 1950
- Lost Trails of the Transvaal, 1956
- Natal and the Zulu Country, 1966
- Shaka's Country: A Book of Zululand, 1952
- The Golden Republic, 1954
- The Great Trek, 1968
- The Hunter is Death, 1962
- The Ivory Trail, 1954
- The White Whirlwind, 1961
- Tickey: The Story of Eric Hoyland, 1976
- To the Banks of the Zambezi, 1965
- To the Shores of Natal, 1953
- Trail of the Copper King, 1959
- Storm over the Transvaal, 1955
- Southern Africa: Land of Beauty and Splendour, 1977
- Scenic Wonders of Southern Africa, 1985
- Tavern of the Seas: The Story Of Cape Town, Robben Island And The Cape Peninsula, 2003 (published posthumously)
