= Prieska =

- Town
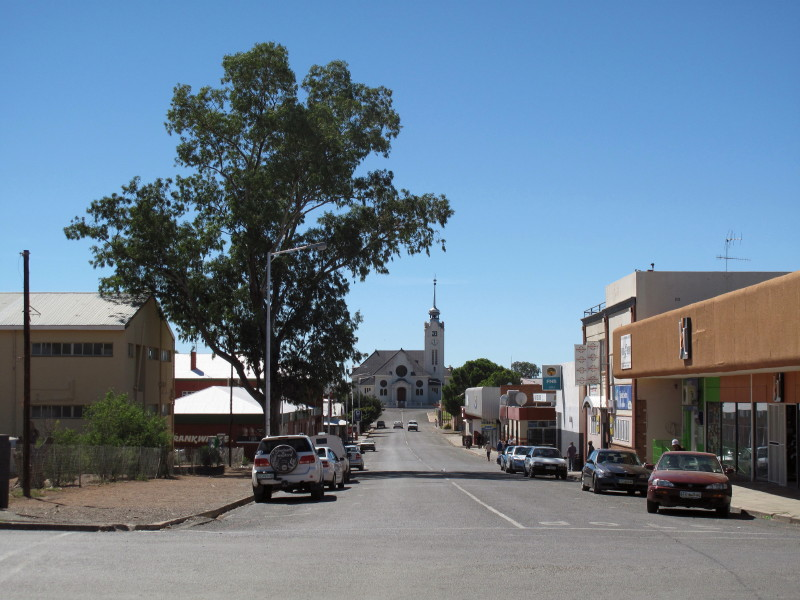
- Prieska

- Location within Northern Cape Location within South Africa Location within Africa
- Coordinates: 29°40′6″S 22°44′38″E
- Country: South Africa
- Province: Northern Cape
- District: Pixley ka Seme
- Municipality: Siyathemba

Area
  - Total: 195.52 km^{2} (75.49 sq mi)

Population (2011)
  - Total: 14,246
  - Density: 72.862/km^{2} (188.71/sq mi)

Racial makeup (2011)
  - Black African: 23.6%
  - Coloured: 67.4%
  - Indian/Asian: 0.5%
  - White: 8.0%
  - Other: 0.4%

First languages (2011)
  - Afrikaans: 92.6%
  - Xhosa: 4.4%
  - English: 1.0%
  - Other: 2.0%
- Time zone: UTC+2 (SAST)
- Postal code (street): 8940
- PO box: 8940
- Area code: 053

Prieska is a town on the south bank of the Orange River, in the province of the Northern Cape, in western South Africa. It is located on the southern bank of the Orange River, 130 km north-west of Britstown and 75 km south-east of Marydale.

== Geography ==
Prieska is 240 kilometers south of Kimberley and lies on the R357 road.

== History ==
Prieska developed from a place to which farmers migrated when the pans were full, after rains. It was originally named Prieschap, the name is derived from Korana and means ‘place of the lost she-goat’. An 1874 resolution of the Beaufort West presbytery of Dutch Reformed Church to establish a congregation in Prieska, came to fruition on 11 March 1878. Prieska was administered by a village management board from 1882 and attained municipal status in 1892. As of 2011, the town has a population of 14,246.

Historically, many residents of Prieska worked at the nearby Koegas mine which extracted and processed blue asbestos.

=== 1878 murders ===
In October 1878, at Luisdraai, near Koegas, a group of Korana and San indigenous people were savagely attacked by a 'military patrol' and 46 were killed. It later came to light that the indigenous people were killed in cold blood, after being disarmed and taken prisoner, eleven of the slain were women and children. The perpetrators were mounted militia, consisting of several white and Griqua farmers.

== Notable people ==
- Gert Thys (born 1971), long-distance runner
- Dricky Beukes (1918–1999), writer

== See also ==
- Tumʔi language, spoken in the town
