= The Gods Must Be Crazy =

1980 film by Jamie Uys

- 1982 American release poster
- Directed by: Jamie Uys
- Written by: Jamie Uys
- Produced by: Jamie Uys
- Starring: Nǃxau ǂToma; Sandra Prinsloo; Marius Weyers; Nic de Jager; Michael Thys; Louw Verwey; Ken Gampu; Simon Sabela
- Narrated by: Paddy O'Byrne
- Cinematography: Buster Reynolds; Robert Lewis; Jamie Uys
- Edited by: Stanford C. Allen; Jamie Uys
- Music by: John Boshoff
- Production company: C.A.T. Films
- Distributed by: Ster-Kinekor Films (South Africa); 20th Century-Fox (International)
- Release date: 10 September 1980 (South Africa)
- Running time: 109 minutes
- Countries: South Africa; Botswana
- Languages: English; Afrikaans; Juǀʼhoan
- Budget: $5 million
- Box office: $200 million

The Gods Must Be Crazy is a 1980 comedy film written, produced, edited and directed by Jamie Uys. An international co-production of South Africa and Botswana, it is the first film in The Gods Must Be Crazy series. Set in Southern Africa, the film stars South West African San farmer Nǃxau ǂToma as Xi, a hunter-gatherer of the Kalahari Desert whose tribe discovers a glass Coca-Cola bottle dropped from an aeroplane, and believes it to be a gift from their gods. When Xi sets out to return the bottle to the gods, his journey becomes intertwined with that of a biologist (Marius Weyers), a newly hired village school teacher (Sandra Prinsloo), and a band of guerrilla terrorists.

The Gods Must Be Crazy was released in South Africa on September 10, 1980, by Ster-Kinekor Films, and broke several box office records in the country, becoming the most financially successful South African film ever produced at the time. The film was a commercial and critical success in most other countries, but took longer to find success in the United States, where it was eventually re-released in 1984 by 20th Century Fox, with its original Afrikaans dialogue dubbed into English. Despite its success, the film attracted controversy for its depiction of race and perceived ignorance of racial segregation (apartheid) in South Africa.

In 1989, it was followed by a sequel The Gods Must Be Crazy II. Three unofficial sequels were produced in Hong Kong, where Nǃxau reprised his role.

== Plot ==
Xi and his San tribe (Note: The San people are also known as the Bushmen, and are referred to as Bushmen throughout The Gods Must Be Crazy. Some sources specify Xi's tribe as being a Juǀʼhoansi tribe.) live happily in the Kalahari Desert, away from industrial civilisation. One day, a glass Coca-Cola bottle, thrown out of an airplane by a pilot, falls to the soft ground unbroken. Xi's people assume the bottle to be a gift from the gods, just like plants and animals, finding countless new uses for it, such as curing animal hides, carrying water, grinding roots, rolling dough, and tracing decorative circular shapes. Only one glass bottle exists, however, and members of the tribe are constantly demanding its use while conflict arises in the erstwhile peaceful tribe. As a result, Xi decides to make a pilgrimage to the edge of the world to dispose of the divisive object.

Meanwhile, biologist Andrew Steyn, who is studying the local wildlife in Botswana, is tasked by the local minister with bringing to the village Kate Thompson, who quit her job as a journalist in Johannesburg, South Africa, to become a village schoolteacher in Botswana. Normally competent and efficient, Andrew becomes awkward and clumsy in a woman's presence. His transport task is made difficult by an ancient Land Rover without brakes that requires him to jump out of the car to place a stone wedge under a wheel to stop it, upsetting Kate. The car stalls while fording a deep river, requiring them to camp out for the night 30 miles from their destination, which Kate finds opportunistic. While Andrew is undressing for bed with his pants down, a wild boar attacks him. Running through the bushes, he trips and falls onto a scantily clad Kate. Not witnessing a rhinoceros stamp out their campfire, Kate thinks Andrew put out the fire himself to scare her into seeking his protection. The next morning Kate gets stuck in a wait-a-bit tree; Andrew tries to rescue her, and they both end up stuck together in their undergarments. Kate increasingly suspects Andrew's bouts of clumsiness are calculated advances. Since their arrival at the village has been long delayed, a swaggering safari tour guide named Jack Hind arrives to take Kate the rest of the way to the village. Andrew's assistant and mechanic, M'pudi, who has been married to seven women, counsels Andrew to explain himself to Kate.

In the fictitious neighbouring state of Biryani, a band of fugitive guerrillas, led by Sam Boga, have killed three cabinet members and injured two others in an attempt on the president's life, sending the military in hot pursuit.

On his trek to dispose of the cursed Coke bottle, Xi finds a herd of goats and shoots one with a tranquilizer arrow, planning to eat it. The goatherd has him arrested, and he is sentenced to 3 months in jail. M'pudi, who once lived with the San and can speak their language, considers the verdict harsh. He and Andrew arrange to hire Xi as a tracker for the remainder of his sentence in lieu of prison time.

Meanwhile, the guerrillas invade Kate's school, taking her and the students hostages as they make their escape to a neighbouring country. Andrew, M'pudi and Xi, immersed in their fieldwork, find themselves along the terrorists' and children's path and concoct a plan. Xi, who is small in stature, slips among the children with a brief note for Kate. Xi uses makeshift tranquilizer darts to immobilize six of the eight guerrillas, allowing Kate and the children to confiscate their firearms. Andrew and M'pudi apprehend the remaining two guerrillas. Hind arrives and takes Kate and the children away, taking credit for the rescue that Andrew, M'pudi and Xi had planned and executed.

Later, with Xi's prison term over, Andrew pays his wages and sends him on his way. Having no use for money, Xi discards it. At M'pudi's counselling, Andrew visits Kate to explain his "interesting psychological phenomenon" of awkwardness around women, but in the process repeatedly knocks over the table and utensils that Kate is setting. Kate finds his efforts endearing and kisses Andrew.

Xi eventually arrives at the top of a cliff with a solid layer of low-lying clouds obscuring the landscape below. Convinced that he has reached the edge of the world, he throws the bottle off the cliff and returns to his family.

== Cast ==
- Nǃxau ǂToma as Xi
- Marius Weyers as Dr. Andrew Steyn
- Sandra Prinsloo as Kate Thompson
  - Voiced by Janet Meshad in the English dub
- Louw Verwey as Sam Boga
- Michael Thys as M'Pudi
  - Voiced by Pip Freedman in the English dub
- Nic de Jager as Jack Hind
- Fanyana Sidumo as Card #1
- Joe Seakatsias as Card #2
- Brian O'Shaughnessy as Mr. Thompson
- Ken Gampu as President

Director Jamie Uys appears in an uncredited role as the Reverend.

== Production ==
=== Development and casting ===
After I made Animals Are Beautiful People, I went back to the Kalahari very often to visit the Bushmen. The more I visited, the more I discovered this thing about them: they don't have a sense of property. They don't know about ownership. If I put my jacket down, one of them would put it on. They share everything. Where they are, there is nothing you can own. It seems so different from the rest of us, who will kill one another over a diamond, because of its scarcity value.

— director Jamie Uys on the San people.

Jamie Uys conceived the premise of The Gods Must Be Crazy while making the 1974 documentary Animals Are Beautiful People. The documentary was filmed partially on the Kalahari Desert, where Uys first encountered the San people and "fell in love with them". Uys chose a Coca-Cola bottle as the object that the San people would discover and covet in The Gods Must Be Crazy because he felt that the bottle was representative of "our plastic society", and because it "is a beautiful thing, if you've never seen glass before".

Uys noted that he modelled the character of Andrew Steyn after himself: "I used to be awkward like that, especially with women. But then, I think most young guys knock things over with their first girl".

After writing the script for The Gods Must Be Crazy, Uys reportedly spent three months traversing the Kalahari Desert with an interpreter, searching for a San person to play the role of Xi in the film. Visiting areas of the desert inhabited by the San, Uys took photographs of individuals he felt he might cast, and then "marked the longitude and latitude, so we could find them again".

Uys decided to cast South West African San farmer Nǃxau ǂToma as Xi, and later recalled that "At first [Nǃxau] didn't understand, because they have no word for work. Then the interpreter asked, 'Would you like to come with us for some days?'" N!xau agreed and flew with Uys by aeroplane to Windhoek, South West Africa (now Namibia), which served as a base for the film's production. Uys stated that "the airplane didn't impress him at all. He thinks we are magicians, so he believes we can do anything. Nothing impressed him". In his hotel room, N!xau agreed to use the toilet, but slept on the floor rather than on the provided bed.

However, according to author Josef Gugler, Uys "[fictionalized] the production of the film. The stories he told reviewers varied". Unlike what was presented in The Gods Must Be Crazy, N!xau did not lead a hunter-gatherer lifestyle; he grew up as a herder on a farm in Botswana, before moving to South West Africa to work as a cook. In the 1980 documentary film Nǃai, the Story of a ǃKung Woman, directed by John Marshall, footage of the filming of The Gods Must Be Crazy is used. The documentary shows San restricted to living in a reservation established by South African authorities in Tsumkwe, South West Africa. The San there are shown to not be hunter-gatherers; they are instead dependent on the government for food and other aid, with some suffering from tuberculosis.

=== Filming ===
The Gods Must Be Crazy was shot in Tsumkwe, South West Africa (today Namibia), as well as in Botswana.

According to Uys, N!xau would be flown back to his home in the Kalahari Desert every three or four weeks to prevent him from suffering from culture shock. During his time in urban areas, N!xau learned to smoke and acquired an affinity for liquor and sake. Uys said that he paid N!xau $300 for his first 10 days of work, but that the money was reportedly blown away by wind. N!xau was then compensated with 12 head of cattle. In 1985, Uys said that he had sent N!xau $100 a month since filming, which N!xau used at a trading store 100 km (60 miles) from his hunting ground; Uys also stated that a $20,000 trust account in N!xau's name had been established.

A scene in which a rhinoceros stomps out a fire is based in a Burmese legend about fire-eating rhinos, which is not widely known in sub-Saharan Africa and appears not to be based in fact.

== Release ==
=== Box office ===
The Gods Must Be Crazy was initially released in South Africa on 10 September 1980 by Ster-Kinekor Pictures. Within its first four days of its release, the film broke box office records in every city in South Africa. It became the highest-grossing film of 1982 in Japan, where it was released under the title Bushman. Executive producer Boet Troskie sold the distribution rights to the film to 45 countries.

For its release in the United States, the original Afrikaans dialogue was dubbed into English, and voiceover work was provided for !Kung and Tswana lines. The film initially received a limited American release through Jensen Farley Pictures in 1982, but performed poorly in at least half a dozen test cities. However, the film would eventually find critical and commercial success when it was re-released by 20th Century Fox on 9 July 1984, becoming the highest-grossing foreign film released in the United States at the time. The film also played at the Music Hall Theater in Beverly Hills, California for at least eight months.

Within its first four years of release, The Gods Must Be Crazy had grossed $90 million worldwide. As of 2014, the film has grossed R 1.8 billion (approx. $200 million) worldwide, including over $60 million in the United States.

=== Critical reception ===
Roger Ebert of the Chicago Sun-Times gave the film three stars out of four, concluding that "it might be easy to make a farce about screwball happenings in the desert, but it's a lot harder to create a funny interaction between nature and human nature. This movie's a nice little treasure". Variety stated that the film's "main virtues are its striking, widescreen visuals of unusual locations, and the sheer educational value of its narration".

In his review of the film for The New York Times, critic Vincent Canby wrote that "watching Jamie Uys's Gods Must Be Crazy, [...] one might suspect that there were no such things as apartheid or the Immorality Act or even South Africa". Though he called the film "often genuinely, nonpolitically funny", he noted that "there's also something disturbing about the film", in that "we tend to feel that any South African work that doesn't actively condemn apartheid has the secondary effect of condoning it, if only through silence".

On the review aggregator website Rotten Tomatoes, The Gods Must Be Crazy has an approval rating of 86% based on 28 reviews, with an average rating of 7.4/10. On Metacritic, which uses a weighted average, the film has a score of 73 out of 100 based on six reviews, indicating "generally favourable reviews".

=== Home media ===
In mid-November 1986, The Gods Must Be Crazy was released on VHS in the U.S. by CBS/Fox on its Playhouse Video label.

In 2004, The Gods Must Be Crazy was released on DVD by Sony Pictures Entertainment. It was also released on DVD as a double feature with The Gods Must Be Crazy II.

== Controversies ==
The Gods Must Be Crazy attracted criticism for its perpetuation of racial stereotypes and ignorance of discrimination and segregation (apartheid) in South Africa. In the U.S., the film was reportedly picketed by the National Conference of Black Lawyers and other anti-apartheid groups when it screened at the 68th Street Playhouse in New York City.

=== Accusations of patronisation ===
Both New York Times critic Vincent Canby and author Josef Gugler called the film "patronising" towards the San people. Canby wrote that the San in the film "are seen to be frightfully quaint if not downright cute", and compared the film's narrator's statement that the San "must be the most contented people in the world" to "exactly the sort of thing that Mussolini might have said when he got those trains running on time". Gugler considered both the film's narrator and the character of Mpudi condescending, writing that "even if Mpudi feels for the San people, he is just as patronising as the narrator: 'They are the sweetest little buggers'". In response to accusations of patronisation, Uys said that "I don't think the film is patronising. When the Bushman is with us in the city, I do patronise him, because he's stupid. But in the desert, he patronises me, because I'm stupid and he's brilliant".

=== Criticisms related to apartheid ===
In 1985, cultural anthropologist Toby Alice Volkman wrote that money was "a pressing concern" for the San when The Gods Must Be Crazy was filmed, with many of them dependent on government aid and purchased food; she noted that many San enlisted in the South African Army due to the high wages it paid. She wrote: "Because the myth of Bushman innocence and bliss underlies the popularity of The Gods Must Be Crazy, it is no surprise that Mr. Uys would like us to believe in it. There is, however, little to laugh about in Bushmanland: 1,000 demoralized, formerly independent foragers crowd into a squalid, tubercular homeland, getting by on handouts of cornmeal and sugar, drinking Johnny Walker or home brew, fighting with one another and joining the South African Army".

The following year, Canadian anthropologist Richard Borshay Lee called the film "an amusing but thinly disguised piece of South African propaganda in which a peculiar element of South African white mythology receives prominent attention". Lee wrote that "the notion that some San in the 1980s remain untouched by 'civilization' is a cruel joke. The San have been the subject of a century of rapid social change and especially in the last twenty years have been forced to endure all the 'benefits' of South Africa's apartheid policies in Namibia".

Gugler wrote that the guerrillas in the film are depicted as "bad Africans [...] dangerous and destructive all right, but they are also indolent and inept. In the end, even Kate Thompson gets to disarm one of them. Their leader, Sam Boga, articulates what the film is showing us about African guerrillas: 'Why do I have to work with amateurs?' He, in turn, serves to confirm the apartheid credo that Africans would be happy with the White dispensation were it not for foreigners fomenting discontent and making trouble". Gugler goes on to state that Uys "[perpetuates] the myths of apartheid: an ordered world with Whites on top, a world where Africans are content but for the interference of outsiders".

When asked about his thoughts on apartheid, Uys commented that "I think it's a mess. We've done some silly, naughty things that we're ashamed of. We're trying to dismantle it, but it's a very complicated thing. If you go too slow, it's bad, and if you go too fast, it will ruin the economy and everyone will starve. I hope I'm not a racist, but everybody likes to think of himself as not racist, and I don't think that any of us can swear we're not racist. If it means you hate the coloured man, I'm not racist. If it means you choose to marry a girl of your own colour, is that racist, too? If the two are in love, it doesn't matter. But I chose a white girl as my wife".

== Sequel and related films ==
The Gods Must Be Crazy was followed by an official sequel, The Gods Must Be Crazy II, released by Columbia Pictures in 1989. It was written and directed by Uys, and again stars N!xau.

An unofficial sequel, Crazy Safari (also titled The Gods Must Be Crazy III), followed, a Hong Kong film starring N!xau. Other unofficial sequels include Crazy Hong Kong (The Gods Must Be Crazy IV) and The Gods Must Be Funny in China (The Gods Must Be Crazy V). Another unrelated film, Jewel of the Gods was marketed in some territories as sequels to The Gods Must Be Crazy.

== Legacy ==
Irish Spring soap had a 1989 commercial parodying the film.

The video for the song "Take Me to Your Leader" by American rock band Incubus pays homage to the film.

== See also ==
- List of cult films
