= Ekoka ǃKung =

ǃKung language of Southern Africa

- Western ǃXuun; North-Central Ju
- Native to: South Africa, Namibia, Angola
- Native speakers: 16,500 (2013)
- Language family: Kxʼa: ǃKung; Northern ǃKung; Ekoka ǃKung
- Dialects: ǀʼAkhwe

Language codes
- ISO 639-3: knw
- Glottolog: kung1261

Ekoka ǃKung (Ekoka ǃXuun, Ekoka-ǃXû, ǃKung-Ekoka) or Western ǃXuun (North-Central Ju) is a variety of the ǃKung dialect cluster, spoken originally in the area of the central Namibian–Angolan border, west of the Okavango River, but since the Angolan Civil War also in South Africa.

== Dialects ==
Heine & Honken (2010) place Ekoka in the Northern–Western branch of ǃXuun (ǃKung), where Ekoka is equivalent to the Western branch. They distinguish three varieties:

- Western ǃXuun (Kung-Ekoka)
  - Tsintsabis (natively ǃxūún; spoken in Tsintsabis, Tsumeb district, N Namibia)
  - ǀAkhwe (natively ǃxūún, ǀʼākhòè ǃxòān "Kwanyama ǃXuun"; spoken in Eenhana, N Namibia)
  - [no name] (natively ǃxūún, ǃʼālè ǃxòān "Valley ǃXuun"; spoken in Eenhana district, N Namibia)

Sands et al. place it in its own branch, which they call North-Central Ju:

- North-Central Ju (Namibia, between the Ovambo River and the Angolan border, around the tributaries of the Okavango River east of Rundu to the Etosha Pan)
  - Tsintsabis
  - ǀʼAkhwe
  - Okongo
  - Ovambo
  - Mpunguvlei

Tsintsabis might actually be Central ǃKung.

== Phonology ==
=== Consonants ===
Ekoka ǃKung has an indistinguishable sound system to Juǀʼhoansi. However, the series of palatal clicks have a fricated lateral release (see fricated palatal clicks). These are provisionally transcribed ⟨𝼋⟩ or ⟨ǃ͡s⟩ etc. and behave similarly to palatal clicks ([ǂ] etc) in terms of not following the back-vowel constraint.

In addition to the twelve 'accompaniments' of clicks in Juǀʼhoansi, Ekoka has preglottalized nasal clicks, such as /ʔᵑǃ/. These are not common cross-linguistically, but are also found in Taa and ǂHoan.

König & Heine (2001) report the following inventory, with the clicks as analyzed by Miller (2011). One of the click series, called 'fortis' in König & Heine, is only attested at two places of articulation; it is not clear which this corresponds to in the table below. There are also prenasalized /ᵐb, ⁿd, ᵑɡ/ in Bantu loans.

Pulmonic consonants												Clicks							
	Bilabial		Alveolar		Post- alveolar		Palatal	Velar		Glottal		Dental Click		Alveolar Click		Lateral Click		Palatal Click	
Nasal		m mʱ		n nʱ			ɲ		ŋ			ᵑ̊ǀʰ	ᵑǀ ᵑǀʱ	ᵑ̊ǃʰ	ᵑǃ ᵑǃʱ	ᵑ̊ǁʰ	ᵑǁ ᵑǁʱ	ᵑ̊ǂǂʰ	ᵑǂǂ ᵑǂǂʱ
Nasal		ˀm ˤm		ˀn ˤn									ˀᵑǀ		ˀᵑǃ		ˀᵑǁ		ˀᵑǂǂ
Stop/ Affricate	p pʰ	b bʱ	t tʰ	d dʱ	tʃ tʃʰ	dʒ dʒʱ		k kʰ	g gʱ	ʔ		ᵏǀ ᵏǀʰ	ᶢǀ ᶢǀʱ	ᵏǃ ᵏǃʰ	ᶢǃ ᶢǃʱ	ᵏǁ ᵏǁʰ	ᶢǁ ᶢǁʱ	ᵏǂǂ ᵏǂǂʰ	ᶢǂǂ ᶢǂǂʱ
Stop/ Affricate		ᵐb		ⁿd					ᵑɡ			ᵑ̊ǀˀ	ᵑǀˀ	ᵑ̊ǃˀ	ᵑǃˀ	ᵑ̊ǁˀ	ᵑǁˀ	ᵑ̊ǂǂˀ	ᵑǂǂˀ
Stop/ Affricate			tᵡ	dʶ	tʃᵡ	dʒᵡʼ						ᵏǀᵡ	ᶢǀʶ	ᵏǃᵡ	ᶢǃʶ	ᵏǁᵡ	ᶢǁʶ	ᵏǂǂᵡ	ᶢǂǂʶ
Stop/ Affricate					tʃʼ	dʒʼ		kxʼ				ǀ͡kxʼ	ᶢǀ͡kxʼ	ǃ͡kxʼ	ᶢǃ͡kxʼ	ǁ͡kxʼ	ᶢǁ͡kxʼ	ǂǂ͡kxʼ	ᶢǂǂ͡kxʼ
Fricative					ʃ			x			ɦ								
Approximant (Lateral)							j		w		ɦ								
Approximant (Lateral)				l															

/tʰ/ is shown as post-alveolar; cf. the epiglottalized /tᵸ/ found in Juǀʼhoan, though this could be an alignment error. Similarly, /tʃʰ/ is shown as palatal, along with /tʃᵡ, dʃᵡʼ/ and in contrast to post-alveolar /tʃ/.

More recently, Heine & König find that Ekoka ǃKung also has a series of preglottalized nasal consonants, including preglottalized nasal clicks:

/ˀm, ˀn, ˀᵑǀ, ˀᵑǃ, ˀᵑǂǂ, ˀᵑǁ/

=== Vowels ===
Ekoka has a full set of modal and murmured (breathy) vowels, as well as pharyngealized back vowels, and a reduced set of modal, murmured, and pharyngealized nasal vowels:

i e a o u – ih eh ah oh uh – aq oq uq – in an un – ahn ohn – aqn oqn uqn

== Grammar ==
Linguistically, ǃKung is generally termed isolating, meaning that words' meanings are changed by the addition of other, separate words, rather than by the addition of affixes or the changing of word structure. A few suffixes exist - for example, distributive plurals are formed with the noun suffix -si or -mhi, but in the main meaning is given only by series of words rather than by grouping of affixes.

ǃKung distinguishes no formal plural, and the suffixes -si and -mhi are optional in usage. The language's word order is adverb–subject–verb–object, and in this it is similar to English: "the snake bites the man" is represented by ǂǂʼaama nǃei zhu (ǂǂʼaama - snake, nǃei - to bite, zhu - man). ǃKung-ekoka uses word and sentence tone contours, and has a very finely differentiated vocabulary for the animals, plants and conditions native to the Kalahari Desert, where the language is spoken. For example, the plant genus Grewia is referred to by five different words, representing five different species in this genus.

== Sources ==
- Bernd Heine & Christa König, 2010. The ǃXun language: A dialect grammar. Cologne: Rüdiger Köppe Verlag.
- König, Christa and Bernd Heine. 2008. A concise dictionary of northwestern !Xun. (Quellen zur Khoisan-Forschung, 21.) Köln: Rüdiger Köppe.
- Amanda Miller et al., 2011, "The Phonetics of the Modernday reflexes of the Proto‐palatal click in Juu languages" (Ekoka and Mangetti Dune)
- Miller, Sands, et al., 2010. "Retroflex Clicks in Two Dialects of ǃXung" (Grootfontein and Ekoka)
