= ǂKxʼaoǁʼae =

IKung dialect spoken in Namibia and Botswana

- Gobabis ǃKung
- ǂKxʼauǁʼein
- Pronunciation: [ǂxʼāōǁˀã̀ẽ̀]
- Native to: Namibia, Botswana
- Native speakers: 5,000 (2003)
- Language family: Kxʼa: ǃKung; Juǀʼhoan; ǂKxʼaoǁʼae

Language codes
- ISO 639-3: (aue merged into ktz Juǀʼhoan in 2015)
- Glottolog: kxau1241
- ELP: ǂKx'au||'ein

ǂKxʼaoǁʼae (English pronunciation: /ˈkaʊkaɪ/ KOW-ky, native pronunciation: [ǂxʼāōǁˀã̀ẽ̀]), also rendered ǂKxʼauǁʼein (/ˈkaʊkeɪn/ KOW-kayn), or Gobabi ǃKung (Gobabis-ǃXû), is an eastern dialect of the Southern ǃKung language, spoken in Botswana (the settlements of Groote Laagte, East Hanahai, Kanagas and Ghanzi in Ghanzi District and on the commercial farms) and in Namibia (the city of Gobabis and settlements along the C22 road to Otjinene as far as Eiseb, Omaheke Region) by about 7,000 people. In Botswana, most speakers are bilingual in Naro or Tswana.

There are numerous spellings of the name, including ǁAuǁei, ǁXʼauǁʼe, and Auen. Endonyms are Juǀʼhoan(si), ǃXun in Namibia and ǂXʼaoǁʼaen (predominantly in Botswana), meaning "northern people" in Naro. It also goes by the names Gobabis ǃKung and Kaukau (which can take the noun class prefixes in Tswana to give Mokaukau for one person, Bakaukau for the group and Sekaukau for the language).

In Namibia, ǂKxʼaoǁʼae tends to refer literally to the ǃXuun speakers to the north in the Caprivi area. With the exception of a few cultural traits, speakers of ǂKxʼaoǁʼae and those of Juǀʼhoan both in Botswana and Namibia argue that they are one and the same people, speaking one language, with some dialectal attributes.

The non-Latin characters used by the language predominantly refer to click consonants and follow the orthography by Patrick Dickens for Juǀʼhoan.

The limited data on these dialects is poorly transcribed, but as of 2015 fieldwork is in progress.
