= Crazy Safari =

1991 Hong Kong film by Billy Chan

- Film poster
- Traditional Chinese: 非洲和尚
- Simplified Chinese: 非洲和尚
- Hanyu Pinyin: Fēizhōu héshang
- Jyutping: fei1 zau1 wo4 soeng6
- Directed by: Billy Chan
- Written by: Barry Wong
- Produced by: Charles Heung; Barry Wong
- Starring: N!xau; Lam Ching-ying
- Narrated by: Stephen Chow; Ng Man-tat
- Cinematography: Chan Dung-Chuen; Chan Jun-Git
- Edited by: Poon Hung
- Music by: Lowell Lo
- Production company: Samico Films Production Company Ltd.
- Distributed by: Golden Harvest; Win's Film Production
- Release date: 5 July 1991
- Running time: 96 minutes
- Countries: Hong Kong; Botswana
- Language: Cantonese
- Box office: HK$10,956,105.00

Crazy Safari (Chinese: 非洲和尚; pinyin: Fei zhou he shang; literally: African Monk), also known as The Gods Must Be Crazy III, is a 1991 Hong Kong comedy film, directed by Billy Chan. The film is an unofficial sequel to The Gods Must Be Crazy II and part of a trend of jiangshi films, horror comedies with hopping corpses, that were popular in Hong Kong throughout the 1980s and 1990s. It was followed by Crazy Hong Kong (1993) and The Gods Must Be Funny in China (1994). This was N!xau's first Hong Kong film.

== Plot ==
An ancient but still fleshy Chinese corpse is on auction in England. A young businessman (Sam Christopher Chan) purchases the corpse. The corpse is revealed to be the body of his third great-grandfather and he intends to give it a proper burial in Hong Kong. To keep it from becoming an irrepressible vampire, the descendant hires a good-natured Taoist priest (Lam Ching-ying) to maintain control of the cadaver using a yellow talisman. The young descendant and the Taoist priest decide that the best way to get the valued ancestor home is via a direct flight to Hong Kong on a private charter flight.

During the flight, the plane malfunctions and an altercation breaks out between the ruthless pilot and the two passengers. Luckily, they outsmart the pilot and descend from the troublesome plane using parachutes. The corpse and the two men end up separated during the chaos, as they land in Africa.

The corpse lands in front of Xixo (N!xau), where he and his tribe are being confronted by a rival clan led by two greedy Caucasians. The corpse's presence scares away the villains. Xixo discovers how to control the corpse using bells and he takes it to his tribe. Soon he and his family think of it as a gift from the gods, as it aids them in various matters, such as bringing down fruit from towering trees.

The descendant and the priest land in a vast and dry area miles away from Xixo's home. Confronting an assortment of African animals, they make their way across the foreign land in search of the corpse and rescue. During this time, the corpse forms a strong bond with the compassionate Xixo and his family. Days later, the descendant and the priest meet Xixo and his family. Not knowing they have the corpse, the two nevertheless stay with them, finding food, water, and shelter. They begin forming a friendship, despite the language barrier, as they all help out each other when in need.

Days later, the priest figures that the corpse must be nearby, since he connects the strange lack of birds in the area with the ominous close presence of a cadaver. Using magic, he summons the corpse to his hut. Xixo and his family frantically chase the corpse. After the corpse reunites with his descendant, the priest proves to Xixo that it belongs to them, and Xixo eventually agrees. After a few more days of living together, they prepare to part ways with the bushmen and Xixo leads them to the main path to civilisation. However, the rival clan is still after what Xixo's homeland has as a natural abundance: diamonds, as they invade the huts and threaten the residents. The corpse, feeling obligated to aid Xixo and his family, goes back, with the priest and the descendant following. A battle takes place between the villains and Xixo's people, with the corpse managing to chase away one of the ruthless leaders. The priest even summons the spirit of the late Bruce Lee to aid Xixo, and the villains are finally defeated. The priest uses the radio left in the villains' Jeep to contact a helicopter. Before boarding, the priest, the descendant, and the corpse bid farewell to Xixo and his family.

== English Version ==
There is an English version of the movie. The film, originally shot in Cantonese, was re-shot in English because it was expected to be popular not only in China but also in many countries around the world (due to its status as a sequel to the series), and therefore dubbing (voice acting) was not desired. The English version is not dubbed; the scenes were shot twice with the same actors and the same crew. After performing the same scene in Cantonese, the actors spoke English in the second take. There are also some sequences that are not in the other version. Some scenes feature different actors, and some actors take on different roles. Although some sources indicate the second version as "hard-dub," this is incorrect. This is another version, filmed with partially different actors. The two versions also have different running times.

== Cast and roles ==
- N!xau – Xixo the San
- Lam Ching-ying – Master HiSing (Cantonese version), Wise One (English version)
- Sam Christopher Chan – Leo (Cantonese version), Sam (English version)
- Peter Chan Lung – The Vampire (Cantonese version), Ancestor (English version)
- Stephen Chow – Narrator (Cantonese version)
- Ng Man Tat – Narrator (Cantonese version)
- Peter Pau – Mr. Szeto
- Paddy O'Byrne – Narrator (voice: English version)
- Michelle Bestbier – Susan
- Saul Bamberger – Johnson
- Peter Mahlangu – Peter
- Bo Kaesje – Ball
- Christopher Kubheka – Xabo
- Elias Meintjies – Tree
