= Nǃxau ǂToma =

Namibian farmer and actor (c. 1944–2003)

- Nǃxau in 2003
- Born: c. 1944 (officially 16 December 1944); Tsumkwe, South West Africa (present-day Namibia)
- Died: 5 July 2003 (aged 58); Tsumkwe, Namibia
- Other names: Nǃxau; Gǃkau; Gcao Tekene Çoma
- Occupations: Bush farmer, actor
- Years active: 1980–1994
- Spouse: Kora Coma (m. ?–2003)
- Children: 6

Nǃxau ǂToma (Note: The letter in his name that looks like an exclamation mark is an alveolar click in his native language of Juǀʼhoan.) (Juǀʼhoan: [ᵑǃᵡau ᵏǂtoma], short: Nǃxau, alternative spelling Gcao Tekene Çoma; c. 1944 – 5 July 2003) was a Namibian bush farmer and actor who starred in the 1980 film The Gods Must Be Crazy and its sequels, in which he played the Kalahari Bushman Xixo. The Namibian called him "Namibia's most famous actor".

== Biography ==
Nǃxau was a member of the ǃKung people, one of several peoples known as Bushmen. He spoke Juǀʼhoan, Otjiherero, and Tswana fluently, as well as some Afrikaans.

N!xau did not know his exact age, and before his appearance in the films, he had little experience beyond his home. He had only ever seen three white people before casting, and when director Jamie Uys gave him his first cash payment of $300 for The Gods Must Be Crazy, he allegedly let it blow away in the wind. This was despite money already being a serious matter for other San since many of them depended on purchased food and government aid, and/or had enlisted in the South African Army due to the high wages it paid. He was, however, able to negotiate for nearly several hundred thousand for his appearance in the sequel. He came from a culture that did not value the material things that money could buy and consequently had not learned money management skills, although he used some of his income to build a brick house with running water and electricity for his family. He also bought a used car and subsequently hired a chauffeur, as he had no desire to learn to drive.

Nǃxau converted to Christianity, and in July 2000, he was baptized as a Seventh-day Adventist.

He was found dead in late June 2003 near his home in Namibia after going out to collect firewood and on an excursion to hunt guineafowl. He died from multiple-drug-resistant tuberculosis. According to official estimates, he was about 58 or 59 years old at the time. He was buried on 12 July in a semi-traditional ceremony at Tsumkwe, next to the grave of his second wife. He had six surviving children.

== Career ==
In addition to The Gods Must Be Crazy, Nǃxau starred in a series of sequels: The Gods Must Be Crazy II, Crazy Safari, Crazy Hong Kong, and The Gods Must Be Funny in China. After his film career ended, he returned to Namibia, where he farmed maize, pumpkins, and beans, and kept several head of cattle (but no more than 20 at a time because, according to The Independent, without the complex farming systems of the "modern world", he had trouble keeping track of more; the Namibian local daily New Era stated that he simply could not count further than 20).

== Filmography ==
| Year | Title | Role | Notes |
|---|---|---|---|
| 1980 | The Gods Must Be Crazy | Xi | |
| 1989 | The Gods Must Be Crazy II | Xixo | |
| 1990 | Oh Schucks...! Here Comes UNTAG | | Also known as Kwagga Strikes Back |
| 1991 | Crazy Safari | Nǃxau The Bushman | |
| 1993 | Crazy Hong Kong | Xi | |
| 1994 | The Gods Must Be Funny in China | N!xau – Bushman | |
| 2004 | Journey to Nyae Nyae | Self | Video documentary featurette; final film appearance |

=== TV variety show ===
- Sekai Ururun Taizaiki (世界ウルルン滞在記) (1996) – Self
