= Sekele language =

Language

Sekele
- Northern ǃKung
- Native to: Namibia, Angola
- Region: Okavango and Ovamboland Territory
- Native speakers: 20,000 (2013–2019)
- Language family: Kxʼa: ǃKung; Sekele
- Dialects: ǃʼOǃKung; Ekoka ǃKung; Kavango ǃKung

Language codes
- ISO 639-3: vaj – inclusive code Individual code: knw – Ekoka ǃKung
- Glottolog: vase1234 kung1261

Sekele is the northern language of the ǃKung dialect continuum. It was widespread in southern Angola before the Angolan Civil War, but those varieties are now spoken principally among a diaspora in northern Namibia. There are also a number of dialects spoken in far northern Namibia.

Sekele is known by a number of names. "Sekele" itself derives from Vasekele, the Angolan Bantu name. It is also known as Northern ǃKung, Northern ǃXuun, and Northern Ju. Two of the Angolan varieties have gone by the outdated term ǃʼOǃKung (or ǃʼO ǃuŋ [ǃˀoːǃʰũ], "Forest ǃKung") and Maligo (short for "Sekele Maligo"). There are several Namibian dialects, of which the best-known is Ekoka.

== Dialects ==
There is a division between the northernmost dialects, formerly known as Angolan ǃKung or Northern ǃKung, and the more southern dialects of northernmost Namibia, which are known as Western ǃKung or North-Central ǃKung, as well as between them and the eastern dialect of Kavango ǃKung. These northern dialects include:

- Angolan (Northern) ǃKung, originally of Southern Angola, which is situated around the Cunene, Cubango, Cuito, and Cuando Rivers;

(N1) Maligo (ǃxuun, kúándò ǃxuun "Kwando ǃXuun", southeast Angola);
(N2) ǃʼOǃKung (ǃʼo ǃuŋ "Forest ǃXuun"; east central Angola);

- Western (North-Central) ǃKung (ǃKung-Ekoka), of northern Namibia, between the Ovambo River and the Angolan border, around the tributaries of the Okavango River east of Rundu to the Etosha Pan;

(W1) — (ǃxūún, ǃʼālè ǃxòān "Valley ǃXuun"; Eenhana district, northern Namibia);
(W2) ǀʼAkhwe (ǃxūún, ǀʼākhòè ǃxòān "Kwanyama ǃXuun"; Eenhana, northern Namibia);
(W3) Tsintsabis (ǃxūún; Tsintsabis, Tsumeb district, northern Namibia);

- (K) Kavango ǃKung (ǃxūún, known as dom ǃxūún "River ǃXuun" in Ekoka; Western Rundu district, northern Namibia, & Angola adjacent)

The Okongo, Ovambo, and Mpunguvlei dialects may duplicate (W1) and (K) or be additional forms.

A dialect of Angolan Sekele currently being investigated by linguists has been labeled Mangetti Dune ǃKung, and is spoken by a resettled diaspora community of 500–1000 in Namibia and South Africa in the settlements of Mangetti Dune and Omtaku, east of Grootfontein, Namibia; and in Schmidtsdrif, west of Kimberley, South Africa.

== Phonology ==
Angolan ǃKung

Mangetti Dune ǃKung has clicks with four places of articulation, /ǃ ǀ ǁ ǂ/. A reported distinction between dental lateral and postalveolar lateral clicks has not been confirmed by further research. These clicks come in the same eight series as in Grootfontein ǃKung, represented with the palatal articulation:

Lingual /ᵏǂ ᵏǂʰ ᶢǂ ᵑǂ ᵑ̊ǂʰ/
glottalized /ᵑ̊ǂˀ/
linguo-pulmonic /ᵏǂχ/
linguo-glottalic /ǂ͡kxʼ/

Western (North-Central) ǃKung
