= Pip Freedman =

South African comedian and actor (1925–2003)

- Born: Philip Maurice Freedman; July 14, 1925; Swellendam, Cape Province, Union of South Africa
- Died: May 19, 2003 (aged 77); Cape Town, Western Cape, South Africa
- Occupations: Comedian and Actor
- Years active: 1950s-2002
- Known for: The Pip Freedman Show on Springbok Radio

Pip Freedman (14 July 1925 – 19 May 2003) was a South African-born radio comedian and film actor and was best known for his performances on SABC's Springbok Radio on the show, The Pip Freedman Show. His career, starting in the 1950s, spanned six decades until 2002.

== Background ==
He was born Philip Maurice Freedman in Swellendam, Cape Province in 1925. He was married twice. He met his second wife Pat in 1967 and married in 1973. He had two children from his first marriage, Jeremy and Gayle Freedman, and Jonathan and Samantha Freedman from his marriage to Pat. He died at the Life Kingsbury Hospital, Cape Town of a blood clot in his leg.

== Career ==
He started his career at the Starlight Theatre at Sea Point, Cape Town. He would join the SABC in 1950's. He was brought in by Cecile Whiteman and replaced Gabriel Bauman on the show, Snoektown Calling. He would perform on the radio show Next Stop Makouvlei from 1969 until 1972, a live show produced by Pieter van der Bijl and which was turned into a movie of the same name. His own radio show was The Pip Freedman Show, broadcast on Springbok Radio from January 1968 until 1985 when the radio station closed for the last time. In the show he would take-off the mannerism, humour, and voices of the different ethnic races of the Western Cape without resorting to being coarse or disrespectful.

== Filmography ==
=== Films ===
- The Gods Must Be Crazy (1980)
- Die Spook van Donkergat (1973)
- Next Stop Makouvlei (1972)
- Banana beach (1970)
