= Juǀʼhoan language =

Kxʼa language spoken in Southern Africa

Juǀʼhoan
- South(eastern) ǃXun/Ju ǃXunthali
- A Juǀʼhoan speaker, recorded in Namibia.
- Pronunciation: [ʒuᵑ̊ǀʰwã]
- Native to: Namibia, Botswana
- Region: near border with Angola
- Ethnicity: Juǀʼhoansi
- Native speakers: 4,000 (2003)
- Language family: Kxʼa: ǃKung; Juǀʼhoan
- Dialects: ǂKxʼauǁʼein

Language codes
- ISO 639-3: ktz
- Glottolog: juho1239
- ELP: Ju|'hoan

Juǀʼhoan (English: /ˈdʒuːtwæn/ JOO-twan, Juǀʼhoan: [ʒuᵑ̊ǀʰwã]), also known as Southern or Southeastern ǃKung, ǃXun, or ǃXunthali, is the southern variety of the ǃKung dialect continuum, spoken in northeastern Namibia and the Northwest District of Botswana by San Bushmen who largely identify themselves as Juǀʼhoansi. Several regional dialects are distinguished: Epukiro, Tsumǃkwe, Rundu, Omatako and ǂKxʼauǁʼein, with Tsumǃkwe being the best described and often taken as representative.

== Name ==
The name Juǀʼhoan (in the plural: Juǀʼhoansi) is also rendered Žuǀʼhõa – or occasionally Zhuǀʼhõa or Dzuǀʼhõa, depending on orthography. Depending on the classification, it is considered the Southern or Southeastern variety of the ǃKung (also rendered ǃXun) language cluster. It may thus be referred to as Southern ǃKung, Southeastern ǃXun, etc. Juǀʼhoan is based on the word ju 'people', which is also applied to the language cluster. (see ǃKung languages for variants of those names).

== Phonology ==
=== Vowels ===
	Oral vowels		Nasal vowels	
	Front	Back	Front	Back
Close	i	u	ĩ	ũ
Close-mid	e	o	ẽ	õ
Open	a		ã	

- When a front vowel /e/ or /i/ follows a consonant with a back vowel constraint (e.g. clicks with uvular articulation), ə is inserted before the front vowel, written 'a' in the orthography. For example, mi ǀʼae 'myself' is pronounced /mi ǀʼəe/.
- The diphthong /oa/ may be realized as [wa].

Juǀʼhoan has five vowel qualities, which may be nasalized, glottalized, murmured, or combinations of these, and most of these possibilities occur both long and short. The qualities /a/ and /o/ may also be pharyngealized and strident (epiglottalized). Besides, it is a tonal language with four tones: very high, high, low and very low tones. Thus, there are a good 30 vowel phonemes, perhaps more, depending on one's analysis. There are, in addition, many vowel sequences and diphthongs.

=== Consonants ===
Juǀʼhoan has an unusually large number of consonants, as typical for ǃKung. The following occur at the beginnings of roots. For brevity, only the alveolar clicks are listed with the other consonants; the complete set of clicks is found below.

		Labial	Alveolar		Postalveolar /Palatal	Velar	Corresponding Click	Glottal
Nasal	voiced	m	n			ŋ	ᵑǃ	
Nasal	murmured	(mʱ)					ᵑǃʱ	
Nasal	aspirated						ᵑ̊ǃʰ	
Plosive	voiced	b	d	dz	dʒ	ɡ	ᶢǃ	
Plosive	tenuis	p	t	ts	tʃ	k	ᵏǃ	(ʔ)
Plosive	aspirated	pʰ	tʰ	tsʰ	tʃʰ	kʰ	ᵏǃʰ	
Plosive	prevoiced aspirated	b͡pʰ	d͡tʰ	d͡tsʰ	d͡tʃʰ	ɡ͡kʰ	ᶢᵏǃʰ	
Plosive	ejective / glottalized		tsʼ		tʃʼ	kxʼ	ᵑǃˀ	
Plosive	prevoiced ejective		d͡tsʼ		d͡tʃʼ			
Plosive	uvularized		tᵡ				ᵏǃᵡ	
Plosive	prevoiced uvularized		d͡tᵡ	d͡tsᵡ	d͡tʃᵡ		ᶢᵏǃᵡ	
Plosive	uvular-ejected		tᵡʼ			kᵡʼ	ᵏǃᵡʼ	
Plosive	prevoiced uvular-ejected					ɡ͡kᵡʼ	ᶢᵏǃᵡʼ	
Fricative	voiced		z		ʒ			ɦ
Fricative	voiceless	(f)	s		ʃ	χ		

Tenuis and modally voiced consonants (blue) may occur with any vowel quality. However, other consonants (grey, transcribed with a superscript diacritic to their right) do not occur in the same root as murmured, glottalized, or epiglottalized vowels.

The prevoiced aspirated and ejective consonants, both pulmonic and clicks, contain a voiceless interval, which Miller (2003) attributes to a larger glottal opening than is found in Hindustani breathy-voiced consonants. Phonetically, however, they are voice contours, starting out voiced but becoming voiceless for the aspiration or ejection.

The phonemic status of [ʔ], [dz] and [dʒ] is uncertain. [ʔ] may be epenthetic before vowel-initial words; alternatively, it may be that no word may begin with a vowel. /mʱ/ occurs only in a single morpheme, the plural diminutive enclitic /mʱi/. /f/ and /l/ (not shown) only occur in loan words, and some accounts posit a /j/ and /w/. Labials (/p, pʰ, b, b͡pʰ, m/) are very rare initially, though β̞ is common between vowels. Velar stops (oral and nasal) are rare initially and very rare medially.

The uvulo-ejective consonants are analyzed as epiglottalized in Miller-Ockhuizen (2003). They have uvular frication and glottalization, and are similar to consonants in Nǀu described as uvular ejective by Miller et al. (2009). Their epiglottal character may be a phonetic consequence of the raised larynx involved in making them ejective.

Only a small set of consonants occur between vowels within roots. These are:

Labial	Alveolar	Velar	Uvular	Glottal
β̞	ɾ	ɣ		
m	n	ŋ		
		k, ᵑk	q͡χʼ	
			χ	ɦ

Medial [β̞, ɾ, m, n] (green) are very common; [ɣ, ŋ] are rare, and the other medial consonants occur in only a very few roots, many of them loans. [β̞, ɾ, ɣ] are generally analyzed as allophones of /b, d, ɡ/. However, [ɾ] especially may correspond to multiple root-initial consonants.

Juǀʼhoan has 48 click consonants. There are four click "types": dental, lateral, alveolar, and palatal, each of which found in twelve series or "accompaniments" (combinations of manner, phonation, and contour). They are preferred over non-clicks in word-initial position.

'noisy' clicks		'sharp' clicks		series
dental	lateral	alveolar	palatal	series
ᵏǀ	ᵏǁ	ᵏǃ	ᵏǂ	Tenuis
ᶢǀ	ᶢǁ	ᶢǃ	ᶢǂ	Voiced
ᵑǀ	ᵑǁ	ᵑǃ	ᵑǂ	Nasal
ᵏǀʰ	ᵏǁʰ	ᵏǃʰ	ᵏǂʰ	Aspirated
ᶢᵏǀʰ	ᶢᵏǁʰ	ᶢᵏǃʰ	ᶢᵏǂʰ	Pre-voiced aspirated
ᵑ̊ǀʰ	ᵑ̊ǁʰ	ᵑ̊ǃʰ	ᵑ̊ǂʰ	Aspirated nasal
ᵑǀʱ	ᵑǁʱ	ᵑǃʱ	ᵑǂʱ	Murmured nasal
ᵑǀˀ	ᵑǁˀ	ᵑǃˀ	ᵑǂˀ	Glottalized nasal
ᵏǀᵡ	ᵏǁᵡ	ᵏǃᵡ	ᵏǂᵡ	Linguo-pulmonic contour
ᶢᵏǀᵡ	ᶢᵏǁᵡ	ᶢᵏǃᵡ	ᶢᵏǂᵡ	Voiced linguo-pulmonic
ᵏǀᵡʼ	ᵏǁᵡʼ	ᵏǃᵡʼ	ᵏǂᵡʼ	Epiglottalized (heterorganic contour)
ᶢǀᵡʼ	ᶢǁᵡʼ	ᶢǃᵡʼ	ᶢǂᵡʼ	Voiced epiglottalized

As above, tenuis and modally voiced consonants (blue) may occur with any vowel quality. However, other consonants (grey, transcribed with a superscript diacritic to their right) do not occur in the same root as murmured, glottalized, or epiglottalized vowels.

Glottalized clicks occur almost exclusively before nasal vowels. This suggests they are nasalized, as in most if not all other languages with glottalized clicks. The nasalization would not be audible during the click itself due to the glottalization, which would prevent any nasal airflow, but the velum would be lowered, potentially nasalizing adjacent vowels.

The 'uvularized' clicks are actually linguo-pulmonic contours, [ǃ͡qχ], etc. The 'uvulo-ejective' clicks are heterorganic affricates, and equivalent to linguo-glottalic consonants transcribed [ǃ͡kxʼ], etc., in other languages (Miller 2011).

See Ekoka ǃXung for a related variety with a somewhat larger click inventory.

== Orthographic history ==
Ju|ʼhoan is the only variety of ǃKung to be written. Three orthographies have been used over the past half century, two based on pipe letters for clicks and one using only the basic Latin alphabet.

In the 1960s, the South African Department of Education set about establishing official orthographies for the languages of Southwest Africa (Namibia). Jan Snyman was selected to develop an orthography for the then-unwritten Juǀʼhoasi, which was accepted in 1969. In this orthography, the name of the language is spelled Žuǀʼhõasi. A slightly modified form (Snyman 1975) is shown below.

In the 1980s, the Bible Society of South Africa requested a new orthography, one that used only letters of the Latin alphabet, avoided diacritics as much as possible, and conformed as much as possible to the conventions of Afrikaans. This second orthography was accepted in 1987, in which the language is spelled Zjuc'hôa.

A third orthography was developed by the Juǀwa Bushman Development Foundation in 1994. This is the orthography that is currently in use in Namibia; there does not seem to be any publication in Botswana.

The three orthographies, along with the IPA, are compared below. Tone is evidently unmarked.

Comparison of Juǀʼhoan orthographies
	Labial plosives				Alveolar plosives				Velar plosives				Alveolar affricates					Postalveolar affricates					
IPA	[b]	[p]	[b͡pʰ]	[pʰ]	[d]	[t]	[d͡tʰ]	[tʰ]	[ɡ]	[k]	[ɡ͡kʰ]	[kʰ]	[ts]	[d͡tsʰ]	[tsʰ]	[d͡tsʼ]	[tsʼ]	[tʃ]	[d͡tʃʰ]	[tʃʰ]	[d͡tʃʼ]	[tʃʼ]	[kxʼ]
1994–present	b	p	bh	ph	d	t	dh	th	g	k	gh	kh	ts	dsh	tsh	ds	tz	tc	dch	tch	dc	tj	kx
1975–1987	b	p	bh	ph	d	t	dh	th	g	k	gh	kh	ts	dsh	tsh	dsʼ	tsʼ	tš	dšh	tšh	dšʼ	tšʼ	kxʼ
1987–1994	b	p	bh	ph	d	t	dh	th	gh	k	ʼgh	kh	ts	dsh	tsh	dsʼ	tsʼ	tj	djh	tjh	djʼ	tjʼ	kg

	Hetero-organic affricates							Fricates							Nasals		Syllabic Nasals				Approximants	
IPA	[d͡tᵡ]	[tᵡ]	[tᵡʼ]	[d͡tsᵡ]	[tsᵡ]	[d͡tʃᵡ]	[tʃᵡ]	[z]	[s]	[ʒ]	[ʃ]	[χ]	[h]	[ɽ]	[m]	[n]	[m̩]	[ŋ̍]	[m̰]	[m̤]	[j]	[w]
1994–present	dx	tx	tk	dzx	tsx	djx	tcx	z	s	j	c	x	h	r	m	n	m	ang	mq	mh	y	w
1975–1987	dx	tx	txʼ	dzx	tsx	dx	tx	z	s	ž	š	x	h	r	m	n	m	ang	m̭	mh	y	w
1987–1994	dg	tg	tgʼ	-	tsg	djg	tjg	z	s	zj	sj	g	h	r	m	n	m	ang	m̹	mh	y	w

	Dental clicks												Alveolar clicks											
IPA	[ᶢǀ]	[ᵏǀ]	[ᶢᵏǀʰ]	[ᵏǀʰ]	[ᵑǀˀ]	[ᵑ̊ǀʰ]	[ᵑǀ]	[ᵑǀʱ]	[ᶢᵏǀᵡ]	[ᵏǀᵡ]	[ᶢᵏǀᵡʼ]	[ᵏǀᵡʼ]	[ᶢǃ]	[ᵏǃ]	[ᶢᵏǃʰ]	[ᵏǃʰ]	[ᵑǃˀ]	[ᵑ̊ǃʰ]	[ᵑǃ]	[ᵑǃʱ]	[ᶢᵏǃᵡ]	[ᵏǃᵡ]	[ᶢᵏǃᵡʼ]	[ᵏǃᵡʼ]
1994–present	gǀ	ǀ	gǀh	ǀh	ǀʼ	ǀʼh	nǀ	nǀh	gǀx	ǀx	gǀk	ǀk	gǃ	ǃ	gǃh	ǃh	ǃʼ	ǃʼh	nǃ	nǃh	gǃx	ǃx	gǃk	ǃk
1975–1987	gǀ	ǀ	gǀh	ǀh	ǀʼ	ǀʼh	nǀ	nǀʼh	gǀx	ǀx	gǀxʼ	ǀxʼ	gǃ	ǃ	gǃh	ǃh	ǃʼ	ǃʼh	nǃ	nǃʼh	gǃx	ǃx	gǃxʼ	ǃxʼ
1987–1994	gc	c	dch	ch	cʼ	cʼh	nc	nch	dcg	cg	dcgʼ	cgʼ	gq	q	dqh	qh	qʼ	qʼh	nq	nqh	dqg	qg	dqgʼ	qgʼ

	Palatal clicks												Lateral clicks											
IPA	[ᶢǂ]	[ᵏǂ]	[ᶢᵏǂʰ]	[ᵏǂʰ]	[ᵑǂˀ]	[ᵑ̊ǂʰ]	[ᵑǂ]	[ᵑǂʱ]	[ᶢᵏǂᵡ]	[ᵏǂᵡ]	[ᶢᵏǂᵡʼ]	[ᵏǂᵡʼ]	[ᶢǁ]	[ᵏǁ]	[ᶢᵏǁʰ]	[ᵏǁʰ]	[ᵑǁˀ]	[ᵑ̊ǁʰ]	[ᵑǁ]	[ᵑǁʱ]	[ᶢᵏǁᵡ]	[ᵏǁᵡ]	[ᶢᵏǁᵡʼ]	[ᵏǁᵡʼ]
1994–present	gǂ	ǂ	gǂh	ǂh	ǂʼ	ǂʼh	nǂ	nǂh	gǂx	ǂx	gǂk	ǂk	gǁ	ǁ	gǁh	ǁh	ǁʼ	ǁʼh	nǁ	nǁh	gǁx	ǁx	gǁk	ǁk
1975–1987	gǂ	ǂ	gǂh	ǂh	ǂʼ	ǂʼh	nǂ	nǂʼh	gǂx	ǂx	gǂxʼ	ǂxʼ	gǁ	ǁ	gǁh	ǁh	ǁʼ	ǁʼh	nǁ	nǁʼh	gǁx	ǁx	gǁxʼ	ǁxʼ
1987–1994	gç	ç	dçh	çh	çʼ	çʼh	nç	nçh	dçg	çg	dçgʼ	çgʼ	gx	x	dxh	xh	xʼ	xʼh	nx	nxh	dxg	xg	dxgʼ	xgʼ

	Plain vowels					Pressed vowels		Nasal vowels				Pressed Nasal vowels	
IPA	[i]	[e]	[a, ə]	[o]	[u]	[aˤ]	[oˤ]	[ĩ]	[ã]	[õ]	[ũ]	[ãˤ]	[õˤ]
1994–present	i	e	a	o	u	aq	oq	in	an	on	un	aqn	oqn
1975–1987	i	e	a	o	u	a̭	o̭	ĩ	ã	õ	ũ	ã̭	õ̭
1987–1994	i	e	a, e	o	u	a̦	o̦	î	â	ô	û	â̦	ô̦

The modern (1994) orthography also has ih, eh, ah, oh, uh for breathy (murmured) vowels, and ihn, ahn, ohn, uhn for breathy nasal vowels. However, Snyman maintains that these are positional variants of low-tone vowels, and not needed in an orthography (at least, not if tone were marked). Glottalized vowels are written with an apostrophe in all three orthographies.

== Grammar ==
Juǀ'hoan is an isolating, head-initial language that follows a fairly strict SVO word order. There are some exceptions; for instance, interrogatives are formed using the particle ré, which is placed immediately after the subject, but it is also possible to place this emphasis on the object by moving it to the beginning of the sentence and following it with ré instead, as in:

Tjù ré mí ho.
Do I find the house?

=== Nouns and pronouns ===
Nouns are grouped into five noun classes based on animacy and species. Noun class in Juǀ’hoan is entirely covert on the noun and revealed only by agreement behavior between the noun and pronominal elements. In other words, nouns do not inflect for class; the only difference between nouns of different classes is the different sets of third person pronouns associated with each class.

Noun class distinctions are wholly uninfluenced by literal, physical characteristics, and this covert pronominal class marking structure may have resulted from language contact. Juǀ’hoan has no articles nor any other distinction of definiteness or indefiniteness.

==== Number ====
Nouns inflect for plural number, which is formed by the suffixing of -si or -sín or by no change, -Ø. Many nouns have irregular plurals, such as jù (person, plural jú), and the plural form of a noun is not predictable.

Each noun class has its own associated pronoun set, constituting the only morphological difference between noun classes. For example, the noun gǂhòà, "dog", belongs to Class 2, and may be referred to with the third person pronoun ha, whereas gǀúí, "forest", belongs to Class 5, which has ká as its corresponding pronoun.

The noun classes and their pronoun sets are as follows:

Class	General	Possessed	Description	Example
1	ha (sg); sá (dual); hì, sì (pl)	mà (sg); hìsì (pl)	humans and kinship	jù "person"
2	ha (sg); hì (pl)	mà (sg); hìsì (pl)	animals and races	gǂhòà "dog"
3	ha (sg & pl)	mà (sg); màsì (pl)	plants and food	ǁxòè "meteor"
4	hì (sg & pl)	hì (sg); hìsì (pl)	long objects	gǁùú, "meteor"
5	ká (sg & pl)	gá (sg); gásì (pl)	body parts	gǀúí "forest"

Demonstrative pronouns are as follows:

Class	Demonstrative
1	ǁʼàhaà (sg); ǁʼàsà (dual); ǁʼàsìsà, ǁʼàhìsà (pl)
2	ǁʼàhaà (sg); ǁʼàhìsà (pl)
3	ǁʼàhaà (sg & pl)
4	ǁʼàhìà (sg); ǁʼàhìsà (pl)
5	ǁʼàkáà (sg); ǁʼàkásà (pl)

==== Pronouns ====
Pronouns are inflected for number but not case or gender, and unlike nouns, they have three numbers, singular, dual and plural, as well as inclusive and exclusive forms.

The Juǀ’hoan personal pronouns are:

		Singular	Dual	Plural
1st person	exclusive	mí	ètsá	è, èǃá
1st person	inclusive	mí	mtsá	m, mǃá
2nd person		à; há (hort.)	ìtsá	ì, ìǃá
3rd person		ha (n1-3), hì (n4), ká (n5)	sá (n1)	hì (n1-2), sì (n1)

An indefinite pronoun, equivalent to English "one" can be expressed using jù ("person") as in:

Jù óá dcàá.
One does not steal.

==== Noun derivation ====
Juǀ'hoan nouns are derived by the addition of various suffixes to a verb.

Suffix	Description	Verb	Noun Form	English
-kxàò	Agentive	n!arih (drive)	n!arihkxàò	driver
-sí	Place/Manner	n!ún (stand)	n!únsí	position
-Ø	Same Form	gǀaoh (be strong)	gǀaoh	strength
-a	Non-Specific	jaqm (be thin)	jaqma	thinness

=== Verbs ===
Juǀ'hoan verbs are attributive and unconjugated for tense; aspectual distinctions of time are indicated adverbially.

Verb phrases are negated by the particle ǀóá, which precedes the verb. Verbs can also be negated by the simple particle compound ǀóá kú.

Mí ré ǀóá !hún n!haì.
I do not kill the lion.

Reversing the components of this negation compound to ǀóá kú implies that the negated action has never or will never happen, as in:

E ǀóá kú ’m !há.
We never eat meat.

Most distinctions of tense are adverbial constructions using specific adverbs of time, such as:

- |ámà hè (today)
- goàqǂ’àn (yesterday)
- n!homà (tomorrow)

Less commonly, a simple past tense can be indicated by the particle koh, and the imperfective aspect by kú, both of which precede the verb:

Ha koh ǃóá mí.
She told me.

Ha ká kú úá Tjùm!kúí.
He is going to Tsumkwe now.

In combination, koh and kú equate to a habitual action, as in:

Sìǃá koh kú ’m ǃhá nǀè’ésí.
They used to eat meat only.

==== Imperative ====
With very few exceptions, the imperative form is identical to a standard present tense verb. Orthographically, this kind of imperative is indicated by a double exclamation mark.

G!à’ámá!!
Enter!

A more emphatic imperative is expressed by the addition of the second person pronoun, and negative imperatives are expressed by the verb nǀǀah ("leave") or its imperfective form nǀǀah kú, which is often abbreviated to nǀǀaú.

Nǀǀaú tzà!!
Don’t sleep.

Using a first or third person pronoun before an imperative implies a sense of obligation.

M!á ú!!
We should go.

It is also possible to soften a command by using a special form of the second person pronoun, há, alongside the verbal particle m.

Há m hoe!!
Please come.

==== Irregular verbs ====
Some verbs have irregular forms when taking a plural subject or object. Transitive verbs take the irregular plural form when the object is plural, whereas intransitive verbs take the irregular plural when the subject is plural. Some irregulars are shown below:

Sing. Subj.	Pl. Subj.	Definition
n!áng	g!hòó	sit
n!ún'	gǁá	stand
nǂhao	tàqm	fall
!ò’á	xáí	break

Thus:

Mí n|ángá dà’á tzí.
I sat at the fire.

M!á g!hòóá dà’á tzí.
We sat at the fire.

==== Reflexive and reciprocal ====
The particles |’àè ("self") and |’àèsì ("selves") express reflexive action.

Ekú séa é |’àèsì kò spírí.
We are looking at ourselves in the mirror.

Reciprocity is expressed via the pronoun khòè ("each other"). The preceding verb must always take the transitive suffix -a.

Sá áréá khòè.
They love each other.

Oftentimes, reflexive or reciprocal constructions are used to indicate the equivalent of the English passive voice, which does not formally exist in Juǀ'hoan.

==== Transitivity ====
Intransitive verbs can be made transitive by the addition of the suffix -a, which takes a tone identical to the last tone of the verb itself. If this suffix is added to a verb which is already inherently transitive, the verb becomes a “double transitive,” allowing a second noun phrase to come after the first. The second phrase must follow the transitive particle kò and will have an aspectual significance, as in:

Ha kú ǁohma !aìhn kò g|úí.
He was chopping the tree in the forest.

Creissels (2018) labels these verbs as ditransitive because multiple verb phrases can be strung together by kò (a word he describes as an “interposition”) against the nominalizing suffix -a, regardless of function. Baker and Collins (2006) argue that this linking function of kò governs syntactic relationships between differing aspectual distinctions, a feature that Juǀ'hoan shares with other Khoisan languages.

=== Locatives ===
Juǀ'hoan lacks prepositions; in place of them, the relative positions of objects are expressed using nouns that function as Locative indicators.

Noun	Literal meaning	Locative meaning
n!áng	innards, inside	in
tzí	veld, outside	out, around
din	buttock, backside	under
ǀhó	face, flat surface	on
ǁ’ámí	center, middle	between
!ká	heart	in the midst of
!óm	side	beside

These nouns are metaphorically “possessed” by the object that they modify, necessitating a possessive construction. Furthermore, if the possessor object is qualified by an adjective, the possessive particle ǁ’àn must be used, as in:

Tjù n!a’àn ǁ’àn ká n!áng.
[house big POSS innards]
in the big house

In many other cases, this prepositional information is encoded directly into the verb, as in:

- nǃáú (go over)
- ǁ’àbà (step over)
- ǁxàrì (go through)

Verbs of this sort can be used to qualify the action of another verb in sequence, as in:

Tzàmà n!òm n!áú tjù.
[bird fly go-over house]
The bird flew over the house.

These are known as serial verbs, wherein the second verb in the sequence qualifies the direction or location of the first verb. If the second verb in this two-verb sequence is transitive, then the noun phrase following it would be its object, but if the second verb is intransitive, then the following noun phrase would be its subject. Thus:

Utò nǂàq’ú !àò jù.
[car knock fall-over person]
The car knocked the person over.

=== Adjectives ===
Since Juǀ'hoan verbs are attributive, there are relatively few true adjectives in the language. Adjectives follow the noun and most have singular and plural forms (ending in either -sì or -sín), although a few have only one or the other, and there are some adjectives with suppletive plural forms. The following is a comprehensive list of all adjectives in Juǀ'hoan, together with their plural forms.

Adjective	Plural	Definition
dí	-sín	female
dóré	-sín	strange, different
gèsín	-sín	remaining, other
jàn	-sín	good, correct
zé	-sín	new
ǀ’hoàn	-sì	real, true
!’àn	-sì	old, worn

Adjective	Plural	Definition
g’oq	nǁaqè	male
n!a’àn	!àè	adult
nǀè’é		one
nǀúí		certain
waqnkè		each
	n!ànì	three
	tsàqn	two
	tsánkútsán	four
	waqnsì	all, whole
	!xàrè	some

== Common words and phrases ==
- ján ǀàm – Good day
- ǂxáí – Good morning
- ǁáú tzà – Good evening
- gǁàán - Good afternoon
- à ján – How are you?
- ǁáú gè – Goodbye
- jù – person
- jú – people
- gǃú, dohmsoan – water
- nǃaisi u – Bon voyage

== Sample texts ==
Following are some sample texts in the Juǀʼhoan language.

E nǁurì tè kxóní ǀʼùrì ǃóm
we try and fix bicycle wheel
'We tried to fix the bicycle wheel.'

Uto dchuun-a ǀKaece ko nǃama nǃang
car hit-TRANS ǀKaece LK road in
'A car hit ǀKaece in the road'

Besa komm ǁʼama-ǀʼan Oba ko tcisi
Besa EMPH buy-give Oba LK things
'Besa bought Oba some things'

dshau nǂai ʻm-a ha daʼabi ko mari
woman cause eat-TRANS her child LK mielie-meal
'The woman fed her child mealie meal.' (Dickens 2005:84)

mi ba ǁohm-a ǃaihn ko ǀʼai
my father chop-TRANS tree LK axe
'My father chopped the tree with an axe.'

== Films ==
- 1980 – The Gods Must Be Crazy
- 1980 – Nǃai, the Story of a ǃKung Woman

== Bibliography ==
- Dickens, Patrick J. (2005). A Concise Grammar of Juǀʼhoan With a Juǀʼhoan–English Glossary and a Subject Index. Köln: Rüdiger Köppe Verlag. ISBN 978-3-89645-145-3.
- Baker, M. C. and Collins, C. (2006) “Linkers and internal structure of vP.” Natural Language & Linguistic Theory. 24: 307-354.
- Creissels, D. (2018). Interpositions, a rare type of grammatical word. Syntax of the World’s Languages 8, Paris.
- Miller-Ockhuizen, Amanda (2003). The phonetics and phonology of gutturals: case study from Juǀʼhoansi (PDF). Routledge. ISBN 0-203-50640-5. Archived from the original (PDF) on 26 January 2024.
- Pratchett, L. (2021). “An areal and typological appraisal of gender in Ju.” STUF – Language Typology and Universals. 74: 279-302.
- Pratchett, L. (2025). “Multilingualism and Juǀ’hoan language variation enGENDERed in a Namibian boarding school.” In: Ines Fiedler and Lee J. Pratchett (eds.), Areas, families, and pools aplenty: a Festschrift for Tom Güldemann, 31-46. Berlin: Humboldt-Universität zu Berlin. DOI: 10.18452/32635.
- Snyman, Jan W. (1983). "Zuǀʼhõasi, a Khoisan Dialect of South West Africa/Namibia". In Dihoff, Ivan R. (ed.). Current Approaches to African Linguistics. Vol. 1. pp. 115–125. doi:10.1515/9783112420065-007. ISBN 9783112420058.
- Snyman, Jan W. (1997). "A preliminary classification of the ǃXũũ and Zuǀʼhõasi Dialects". In Haacke, W. H. G.; Elderkin, E. D. (eds.). Namibian Languages: Reports and Papers. Namibian African Studies. Vol. 4. Köln: Rüdiger Köppe. pp. 21–106. ISBN 978-3-89645-080-7.
- Snyman, Jan W. An Official Orthography for Žuǀʼhõasi Kokxʼoi. Pretoria.
