= The Gods Must Be Crazy II =

- Theatrical release poster
- Directed by: Jamie Uys
- Written by: Jamie Uys
- Produced by: Boet Troskie
- Starring: N!xau; Lena Farugia; Hans Strydom
- Cinematography: Buster Reynolds
- Edited by: Renée Engelbrecht
- Music by: Charles Fox
- Production company: Weintraub Entertainment Group
- Distributed by: Columbia Pictures (North America); 20th Century Fox (International)
- Release dates: 13 October 1989 (South Africa); 13 April 1990 (United States)
- Running time: 98 minutes
- Countries: Botswana; South Africa; United States
- Languages: English; Afrikaans; Juǀʼhoan

The Gods Must Be Crazy II is a 1989 comedy film written and directed by Jamie Uys, and a sequel to the 1980 film The Gods Must Be Crazy, which Uys also wrote and directed. An international co-production between South Africa, Botswana and the United States, it was produced by the Weintraub Entertainment Group and released by 20th Century Fox on 13 October 1989. In the United States, it was released by Columbia Pictures on 13 April 1990.

== Plot ==
The film has four storylines, which run in parallel and interact:

1. Xixo trying to find his lost children.
2. Two elephant poachers travelling in a truck on which Xixo's children are stuck.
3. A zoologist and a lawyer stranded in a desert.
4. Two soldiers fighting each other.

The story starts with two elephant poachers, the chronically mean "Big Ben" Brenner and his affable but not-very-bright assistant George, crossing the area in which Xixo's tribe lives. Curious about their vehicle, Xixo's son Xiri and daughter Xisa climb into the water tank trailer and are taken for an involuntary ride as the poachers continue. Xixo follows on foot, determined to retrieve his children.

Dr. Ann Taylor, a young lawyer from New York City, arrives at a bush resort to give a lecture at a legal conference. Since she has spare time, she accepts the invitation of a young man to take a joyride in a two-seat, twin-engine ultralight aircraft. They go to see scientist Dr. Stephen Marshall, who has just been radioed that he must report to the resort where Dr. Taylor just came from to tend to a wounded animal they have found. Leaving the other pilot to watch his truck and equipment, he heads for the resort in the ultralight with Ann aboard, but the aircraft encounters severe weather and crashes, stranding them in the Kalahari Desert. In addition, war is brewing, personified by a lost Cuban soldier (Mateo) and his Angolan enemy (Timi), who repeatedly attempt to take each other prisoner.

In the course of the movie, all these people cross paths with Xixo and/or his children. Finally, the plot culminates in the poachers capturing Xixo, Taylor, Marshall, and the two soldiers. Xixo manages to save them, and George, who is actually a nice guy kept under the heel of his boss, gives Xixo directions to his children. The poachers are captured, both soldiers come to somewhat reluctant terms and part without further violence, Taylor and Marshall return to civilization (though not without a last embarrassing accident), entering into a romantic relationship, and Xixo finds his children.

== Cast ==
- Nǃxau ǂToma as Xixo
- Eiros as Xiri
- Nadies as Xisa
- Hans Strydom as Dr. Stephen Marshall
- Lena Farugia as Dr. Ann Taylor
- Erick Bowen Alfaro as Mateo
- Treasure Tshabalala as Timi
- Pierre van Pletzen as George
- Lourens Swanepoel as "Big Ben" Brenner
- Dawid Kruiper as Oom Dawid

== Reception ==
Movie critic Roger Ebert of the Chicago Sun-Times said while the first film is better, he enjoyed the sequel which he called "the work of a patient craftsman, who gets his laughs out of the careful construction of elaborate physical and plot situations. Some of his buildups last for most of a movie, and his punchlines usually are inspired by character traits, not dumb gags."

Variety reported that with the film, director/writer Uys "orchestrates a desert farce of criss-crossing destinies with more assured skill and charming sight-gags, marred only by facile penchant for speeded-up slapstick motion."

Deseret News reviewed the film as "ultimately doomed to fail" to equal the surprise international success of the first film, "and yet The Gods Must Be Crazy II is still a pretty good movie in its own right. Instead of going for laugh after laugh, as the first film did, Gods II settles into a particular direction, building characterizations and laughs, most of the latter coming in the film's second half."

On Rotten Tomatoes, 54% of 13 critics' reviews are positive, with an average rating of 5.8 out of 10. Metacritic, which assigns a weighted average, gave the film a score of 51 out of 100 based on 17 reviews, meaning "mixed or average reviews".
