= Pierre van Pletzen =

South African actor and director

- Born: Pierre van Pletzen; 1 May 1952 (age 74); Stilfontein, Transvaal, Union of South Africa
- Education: University of Potchefstroom
- Occupations: Director, Actor, Writer
- Years active: 1981–present
- Spouse: Elzette Maarschalk (m. 1984 d.1995) Sandra Vaughn (m. 1996)
- Children: 2
- Relatives: Zetske van Pletzen (daughter) Pierre-Henri Van Pletzen ( Peach van Pletzen)
- Website: http://www.pierrevanpletzen.co.za

Pierre van Pletzen (born 1 May 1952) is a South African actor, writer and director. He is best known for the role "Septimus van Zyl" in the television serial 7de Laan. He also worked as an administrator, artistic director, voice-artist, copywriter, and translator.

== Personal life ==
van Pletzen was born on 1 May 1952 in Stilfontein, South Africa. He graduated from the University of Pretoria with a degree in drama.

He is married to fellow actress Sandra Vaughn since 1996. He shares a son: Pierre-Henri, and a daughter: Zetske, with Elzette Maarschalk whom his was previously married to.(1985-1995) His daughter Zetske is also an actress, who played the role of "Marcel van Niekerk" in the soapie 7de Laan.

== Career ==
He made his acting debut for Performing Arts Council of the Transvaal (PACT) and then at Performing Arts Council of the Orange Free State (PACOFS). In 1974, he acted in the play Die Ryk Weduwee for Cape Performing Arts Board (CAPAB). Meanwhile, he worked as a lecturer at Pretoria Technikon’s Drama School. In the mid 1980s, He was made Artistic Head of Drama for PACOFS. In 1982, he made his television debut with the role "Momberg" in the television movie Gideon Scheepers. Then he acted as Eben Meintjies in the series 1922 in 1984, and as "Spike Potas" in the Afrikaans TV-series Orkney Snork Nie in 1989. In 1984, he made directorial debut with the play Babbelkous!. Then in 1988, he remade the play Sleuth, the revival of Anthony Shaffer which was performed at the Andre Huguenet.

In 1989, he made a supportive role in the Hollywood blockbuster The Gods Must Be Crazy II. In 1990, he acted in Windprints and The Fourth Reich. Then he acted in many films such as Taxi to Soweto (1991), Orkney Snork Nie! (1992), Orkney Snork Nie! 2 (1993) and Panic Mechanic (1996). In 1993, he directed the musical play Buddy at the Civic and later Haaks by Chris Vorster in 2005.

In 2000, he joined the cast of popular SABC2 soap opera 7de Laan and played the role as "Septimus van Zyl". He continued to play the role as a series regular for seventeen consecutive years until he resigned in 2017. In the meantime, he became the director of the series until 2016. In 2017, he became the first South African artist to appear on three different television channels simultaneously, by starring in three different Afrikaans shows. After quit from 7de Laan, he joined with kykNET's Afrikaans soap Getroud met Rugby and played the role "Sakkie".

== Filmography ==
Year	Film	Role	Genre	Ref.
1981	Ntunzini-Spa		TV series	
1982	Gideon Scheepers	Momberg	TV movie	
1982	Die Vlakte Duskant Hebron	Sgt. van Zyl	TV movie	
1983	The Hiding of Black Bill	Jacques du Preez	TV movie	
1984	1922	Eben Meintjies	TV series	
1989	Saartjie	Maj. Jorrie Jordaan	TV series	
1989	Louis Motors	Mr. Echo	TV series	
1989	Orkney snork nie!	Spike Potas	TV series	
1989	The Gods Must Be Crazy II	George	Film	
1989	Windprints	Meinert	Film	
1990	The Fourth Reich	Hertzog	Film	
1991	Die Sonkring	Magistrate 1	TV series	
1991	Taxi to Soweto	Arno Theron	Film	
1992	Konings	Tjaart Viljee	TV series	
1992	Die Binnekring II	Dr. Gerhard Winterbach	TV movie	
1992	Orkney Snork Nie!	Spike	Film	
1993	Ballade vir 'n Enkeling II	Gert Greeff	TV series	
1993	Orkney Snork Nie! 2	Spike	Film	
1994	MMG Engineers	Harold Steenkamp	TV series	
1994	Torings	Tjaart Viljee	TV series	
1995	Sleurstroom	Mr. Wessels	TV series	
1996	Vierspel	Roelf	TV series	
1996	Panic Mechanic	Coetzee	Film	
1997	Triptiek II	du Preez	TV series	
1997	Onder Draai die Duiwel Rond	Willem	TV series	
1998	Die Vierde Kabinet	Dominee	TV movie	
1999	Sterk Skemer	Silas Reynders	TV movie	
1999	Saints, Sinners and Settlers	Adriaan Louw	Film	
2000	7de Laan	Septimus (Oubaas) van Zyl, Director	TV series	
2002	Arsenaal	Groenewald	TV series	
2016	Oom	Oom	Film	
2017	Elke Skewe Pot	Oom Koos	TV series	
2017	Meerkat Maantuig	Oupa Willem Joubert	Film	
2017	Phil101	Manie Kraaywinkel	TV series	
2018	Elke Skewe Pot 2	Oom Koos	TV series	
2018	Getroud met Rugby: Die Sepie	Sakkie	TV series	
2018	Mense Mense		TV series	
