= Lena Farugia =

South African-American actress and producer (1951–2019)

- Born: Lena Farugia; 1 June 1951; New York, U.S.
- Died: 18 January 2019 (aged 67); South Africa
- Education: Thomas Moore College; Fordham University; Columbia University
- Occupations: Actress, Screenwriter, Director, Producer
- Years active: 1971–2019
- Height: 1.64 m (5 ft 5 in)
- Spouse: Robert Davies (1977-1995)
- Parents: Giuseppe Farruggia (father); Grazia Grassi (mother)

Nicolina Elizabeth Farruggia (1 June 1951 – 18 January 2019), popularly known as Lena Farugia, was an American-born South African actress, screenwriter, director and producer. She is best known for the roles in the films The Gods Must Be Crazy II and The Sandgrass People.

== Personal life ==
Farugia was born on 1 June 1951 and grew up in Westchester County, New York, United States. Her father, Giuseppe Farruggia, was a supervisor for the Penn Central railroad company. Her mother, Grazia "Grace" Grassi, was a designer with a fashion house. She studied at Thomas Moore College, and dance from Fordham University. She later completed her MA in history from Columbia University.

In 1977, she married South African filmmaker, Robert Davies, but later divorced and then remarried him on 28 August 1996.

Farugia died on 18 January 2019 in South Africa following a battle with cancer, at the age of 67.

== Career ==
After joining with some theatre works, she followed courses in film editing at The New School in Greenwich Village. In the meantime, she acted in Broadway and dinner theatre productions. After the marriage, she moved to South Africa with her then husband and started acting again. In 1976, she starred in a French television series Les Diamants du Président. Then in 1977, she moved to South Africa and acted in the film Mister Deathman. Along with her then husband, she formed the production company "Davnic Productions". In 1987, they produced the drama Saturday Night at the Palace directed by Davies. In 1981 and 1982, she joined the first two seasons of the television series Westgate, both directed by Edgar Bold.

In 1989, she played the female lead role as "Dr. Ann Taylor" in the blockbuster movie The Gods Must Be Crazy II directed by Jamie Uys. After that success, she played another lead role as "Elizabeth Carter" in the film The Sandgrass People directed by Koos Roets. In 2005, she scripted, directed and edited the documentary film An African in Paris. Other than cinema and television, she performed in many stage plays such as: Cat on a Hot Tin Roof (1982), Agnes of God (1983) and Extremities (1984). In 1989, she wrote and acted in the play We and Them.

== Filmography ==
Year	Film	Role	Genre	Ref.
1977	Les diamants du président	Maggie	TV mini series	
1977	Mister Deathman	Pamela	Film	
1979	Land of the Thirst King	Writer, Editor	TV series documentary	
1981	Westgate	Bonny Thornton	TV series	
1982	Westgate II	Bonny Thornton	TV series	
1987	The Fiddler	Jennie Mars	TV mini series	
1987	Saturday Night at the Palace	Associate producer, Supervising editor	Film	
1989	The Gods Must Be Crazy II	Dr. Ann Taylor	Film	
1990	The Sandgrass People	Elizabeth Carter	Film	
1993	Tropical Heat	Alicia	TV series	
1995	Tales of Mystery and Imagination	Woman from Paris	TV series	
1996	Tarzan: The Epic Adventures	Queen Talia	TV series	
1998	Double Shift	Producer	TV series	
2000	Jika Jika	Writer	TV series	
2009	Diamonds	Helen Danielson	Film	
