= Nasal lateral click =

Consonantal sound

ǁ̃ ʖ̃

Nasal lateral velar click

ŋǁ ŋʖ

ᵑǁ ᵑʖ

Nasal lateral uvular click

ɴǁ ɴʖ

ᶰǁ ᶰʖ

A lateral nasal click is a click consonant found primarily among the languages of southern Africa. The symbol in the International Phonetic Alphabet for a nasal lateral click with a velar rear articulation is ⟨ŋ͡ǁ⟩ or ⟨ŋ͜ǁ⟩, commonly abbreviated to ⟨ŋǁ⟩, ⟨ᵑǁ⟩ or ⟨ǁ̃⟩; a symbol abandoned by the IPA but still preferred by some linguists is ⟨ŋ͡ʖ⟩ or ⟨ŋ͜ʖ⟩, abbreviated ⟨ŋʖ⟩, ⟨ᵑʖ⟩ or ⟨ʖ̃⟩. For a click with a uvular rear articulation, the equivalents are ⟨ɴ͡ǁ, ɴ͜ǁ, ɴǁ, ᶰǁ⟩ and ⟨ɴ͡ʖ, ɴ͜ʖ, ɴʖ, ᶰʖ⟩. Sometimes the accompanying letter comes after the click letter, e.g. ⟨ǁŋ⟩ or ⟨ǁᵑ⟩; this may be a simple orthographic choice, or it may imply a difference in the relative timing of the releases.

== Features ==
Features of a lateral nasal click:

- The airstream mechanism is lingual ingressive (also known as velaric ingressive), which means a pocket of air trapped between two closures is rarefied by a "sucking" action of the tongue, rather than being moved by the glottis or the lungs/diaphragm. The release of the forward closure produces the "click" sound. Voiced and nasal clicks have a simultaneous pulmonic egressive airstream.
- Its phonation is voiced, which means the vocal cords vibrate during the articulation.
- It is a nasal consonant, which means air is exclusively allowed to escape through the nose for nasal stops; otherwise, in addition to through the mouth.
- It is a lateral consonant, which means it is produced by directing the airstream over the sides of the tongue, rather than down the middle.

== Occurrence ==
Lateral nasal clicks are found primarily in the various Khoisan language families of southern Africa and in some neighboring Bantu languages.

| Language | Word | IPA | Meaning |
|---|---|---|---|
| ǃKung | nǁan | [ŋ͜ǁàŋ] = [ᵑʖàŋ] | 'marama bean' |
| !Xóõ | ǁnáã | [ŋ͜ǁɑ́ɑ̃] = [ᵑʖɑ́ɑ̃] | 'grewia berry' |
| Hadza | konxa | [koŋ͜ǁa] = [koᵑʖa] | 'to be a pair' |
| Zulu | inxeba | [iɴ͜ǁɛ́ːɓa] = [iᶰʖɛ́ːɓa] | 'wound' |

== Glottalized lateral nasal click ==
Glottalized lateral nasal click

ǁ̃ˀ

ᵑǁʔ

ᵑ̊ǁˀ

ʖ̃ʔ

ᵑʖˀ

All Khoisan languages, and a few Bantu languages, have glottalized nasal clicks. These are formed by closing the glottis so that the click is pronounced in silence; however, any preceding vowel will be nasalized.

| Language | Word | IPA | Meaning |
|---|---|---|---|
| Hadza | slaxxa | [ɬaŋ͜ǁˀa] = [ɬaᵑʖˀa] | 'a split' |
| Khoekhoe | tsoatsoaǁaposa | [tsȍàtsòȁŋ͜ǁˀàpòsa̋] = [tsȍàtsòȁᵑʖˀàpòsa̋] | 'principled' |

| Place → | Labial | | | | | Coronal | | | | | | | | | | Dorsal | | | | | Laryngeal | | | |
| Manner ↓ | Bilabial | | Labiodental | | Linguolabial | | Dental | | Alveolar | | Postalveolar | | Retroflex | | (Alveolo-)palatal | | Velar | | Uvular | | Pharyngeal/epiglottal | | Glottal | |
|---|---|---|---|---|---|---|---|---|---|---|---|---|---|---|---|---|---|---|---|---|---|---|---|---|
| Nasal | m̥ | m | ɱ̊ | ɱ | | n̼ | n̪̊ | n̪ | n̥ | n | n̠̊ | n̠ | ɳ̊ | ɳ | ɲ̊ | ɲ | ŋ̊ | ŋ | ɴ̥ | ɴ | | | | |
| Plosive | p | b | p̪ | b̪ | t̼ | d̼ | t̪ | d̪ | t | d | | | ʈ | ɖ | c | ɟ | k | ɡ | q | ɢ | ʡ | | ʔ | |
| Sibilant affricate | | | | | | | t̪s̪ | d̪z̪ | ts | dz | t̠ʃ | d̠ʒ | tʂ | dʐ | tɕ | dʑ | | | | | | | | |
| Non-sibilant affricate | pɸ | bβ | p̪f | b̪v | | | t̪θ | d̪ð | tɹ̝̊ | dɹ̝ | t̠ɹ̠̊˔ | d̠ɹ̠˔ | | | cç | ɟʝ | kx | ɡɣ | qχ | ɢʁ | ʡʜ | ʡʢ | ʔh | |
| Sibilant fricative | | | | | | | s̪ | z̪ | s | z | ʃ | ʒ | ʂ | ʐ | ɕ | ʑ | | | | | | | | |
| Non-sibilant fricative | ɸ | β | f | v | θ̼ | ð̼ | θ | ð | θ̠ | ð̠ | ɹ̠̊˔ | ɹ̠˔ | ɻ̊˔ | ɻ˔ | ç | ʝ | x | ɣ | χ | ʁ | ħ | ʕ | h | ɦ |
| Approximant | | β̞ | | ʋ | | | | ð̞ | | ɹ | | ɹ̠ | | ɻ | | j | | ɰ | | | | | | ˷ |
| Tap/flap | | ⱱ̟ | | ⱱ | | | | | ɾ̥ | ɾ | | | ɽ̊ | ɽ | | | | | | ɢ̆ | | ʡ̆ | | |
| Trill | ʙ̥ | ʙ | | | | | | | r̥ | r | | r̠ | ɽ̊r̥ | ɽr | | | | | ʀ̥ | ʀ | ʜ | ʢ | | |
| Lateral affricate | | | | | | | | | tɬ | dɮ | | | tꞎ | d𝼅 | c𝼆 | ɟʎ̝ | k𝼄 | ɡʟ̝ | | | | | | |
| Lateral fricative | | | | | | | ɬ̪ | | ɬ | ɮ | | | ꞎ | 𝼅 | 𝼆 | ʎ̝ | 𝼄 | ʟ̝ | | | | | | |
| Lateral approximant | | | | | | | | l̪ | l̥ | l | | l̠ | ɭ̊ | ɭ | ʎ̥ | ʎ | ʟ̥ | ʟ | | ʟ̠ | | | | |
| Lateral tap/flap | | | | | | | | | ɺ̥ | ɺ | | | 𝼈̊ | 𝼈 | | ʎ̆ | | ʟ̆ | | | | | | |

| | | BL | LD | D | A | PA | RF | P | V | U |
|---|---|---|---|---|---|---|---|---|---|---|
| Implosive | Voiced | ɓ | | | ɗ | | ᶑ | ʄ | ɠ | ʛ |
| Implosive | Voiceless | ɓ̥ | | | ɗ̥ | | ᶑ̊ | ʄ̊ | ɠ̊ | ʛ̥ |
| Ejective | Stop | pʼ | | | tʼ | | ʈʼ | cʼ | kʼ | qʼ |
| Ejective | Affricate | | p̪fʼ | t̪θʼ | tsʼ | t̠ʃʼ | tʂʼ | tɕʼ | kxʼ | qχʼ |
| Ejective | Fricative | ɸʼ | fʼ | θʼ | sʼ | ʃʼ | ʂʼ | ɕʼ | xʼ | χʼ |
| Ejective | Lateral affricate | | | | tɬʼ | | | c𝼆ʼ | k𝼄ʼ | q𝼄ʼ |
| Ejective | Lateral fricative | | | | ɬʼ | | | | | |
| Click (top: velar; bottom: uvular) | Tenuis | kʘ qʘ | | kǀ qǀ | kǃ qǃ | | k𝼊 q𝼊 | kǂ qǂ | | |
| Click (top: velar; bottom: uvular) | Voiced | ɡʘ ɢʘ | | ɡǀ ɢǀ | ɡǃ ɢǃ | | ɡ𝼊 ɢ𝼊 | ɡǂ ɢǂ | | |
| Click (top: velar; bottom: uvular) | Nasal | ŋʘ ɴʘ | | ŋǀ ɴǀ | ŋǃ ɴǃ | | ŋ𝼊 ɴ𝼊 | ŋǂ ɴǂ | ʞ | |
| Click (top: velar; bottom: uvular) | Tenuis lateral | | | | kǁ qǁ | | | | | |
| Click (top: velar; bottom: uvular) | Voiced lateral | | | | ɡǁ ɢǁ | | | | | |
| Click (top: velar; bottom: uvular) | Nasal lateral | | | | ŋǁ ɴǁ | | | | | |
