= Paddy O'Byrne =

Irish radio broadcaster and actor (1929–2013)

- Born: 8 December 1929; Killiney, Dublin, Ireland
- Died: 4 December 2013 (aged 83); Mullingar, County Westmeath, Ireland
- Occupation(s): Radio broadcaster, actor
- Years active: 1967–2004

Paddy O'Byrne (8 December 1929 – 4 December 2013) was an Irish radio broadcaster and actor who became one of the best-known radio personalities in South Africa.

== Early life ==
O'Byrne was born in Killiney, a suburb of Dublin, Ireland. He attended St Mary's College, Dublin, Castleknock College and University College Dublin, where he earned a degree in Legal and Political Science. In 1952, he was called to the Kings Inns. In 1954, he abandoned a legal career in favour of the performing arts, joining the George Mitchell Singers in London but had a "day job" working for an insurance company. During the summer season in Llandudno, he met and later married a singer and dancer from Dublin named Vicky Fitzpatrick. They had three children Jane, John (died 1980) and Dominic. He was the son of John O'Byrne, K.C. and Marjorie (née McGuire).

== Career in South Africa ==
O’Byrne emigrated to the Union of South Africa in 1958. In 1961, he won a competition called The Voice of South Africa, thereby gaining a contract with the South African Broadcasting Corporation and a new career. As was commonly the case at the time, both among Irish actors abroad as well as many South Africans in the theatre and broadcast media, he used Received Pronunciation for his professional speaking voice.

In 1980, when the radio station Talk Radio 702 was launched in Johannesburg, he was the first announcer heard on it. He also worked for Radio Today and Radio Veritas, a Roman Catholic station, in Johannesburg and for Fine Music Radio in Cape Town. He also worked for the BBC on Radio 2 and Capital Radio in the United Kingdom, during the 1970s and 1980s.

He was also an actor, and narrated five films, while in South Africa. He was one of a series of actors who played the science-fiction character Mark Saxon in the original radio drama No Place to Hide, originally created by South African author Monty Doyle.

O’Byrne and his family moved to Mullingar in 2001, but he continued to do broadcasts for Irish classical-music radio station Lyric FM, and his programmes for Fine Music Radio were recorded there and transmitted to South Africa for broadcast. He retired in 2004.

In 2010, at the MTN Radio Awards Gala, in Johannesburg, O’Byrne was honoured for his contribution to South African broadcasting, being named one of the inaugural inductees into the Radio Hall of Fame.

== Narrator ==
He narrated two movies from The Gods Must Be Crazy film series, as well as Animals Are Beautiful People.

== Death ==
Paddy O'Byrne died on 4 December 2013, aged 83, in Mullingar, County Westmeath, Ireland.
