= Grootlaagte =

Coordinates: 21°21′37″S 21°12′41″E

Location of Grootlaagte

Grootlaagte is a village in Ghanzi District of Botswana. It is located close to the Namibian border, north-west of the district capital Ghanzi. Grootlaagte has a primary school and the population was 483 in 2001 census.

"Grootlaagte" is Afrikaans and Dutch for "large lowland" (literally: "great lowth").
