= ǃKung languages =

Kxʼa dialect continuum spoken in southern Africa

ǃKung
- Ju
- ǃXun
- Native to: Namibia, Angola, Botswana, South Africa
- Ethnicity: ǃKung
- Native speakers: All varieties: 77,000 (2015)
- Language family: Kxʼa: ǃKung
- Dialects: Northern (Sekele); Central; Southern (Juǀʼhoan)
- Writing system: Latin augmented with click letters

Language codes
- ISO 639-3: Variously: vaj – Northern ǃKung knw – Ekoka ǃKung ktz – Southern ǃKung
- Glottolog: juku1256
- ELP: !Xun

- People: ǃKung
- Language: ǃXun

ǃKung /ˈkʊŋ/ KUUNG (ǃXun), also known as Ju (/ˈdʒuː/ JOO), is a dialect continuum (language complex) spoken in Namibia, Botswana, and Angola by the ǃKung people, constituting two or three languages. Together with the ǂʼAmkoe language, ǃKung forms the Kxʼa language family.

ǃKung is famous for its many clicks, such as the alveolar click ǃ in its name, and has some of the most complex inventories of both consonants and vowels in the world. It also has tone and nasalization. For a description, see Juǀʼhoan. To pronounce ǃXuun (pronounced [ǃ͡χũː˦˥] in Western ǃKung/ǃXuun) one makes an alveolar click sound before the x sound (which is like a Scottish or German ch), followed by a long nasal u vowel with a high rising tone. (Note: For phonology and tones, see list of ǃXun dialect names in Heine & Honken (2010).)

== Names ==
The term ǃKung, or variants thereof, is typically used when considering the dialects to constitute a single language; Ju tends to be used when considering them as a small language family. ǃKung is also sometimes used for the northern/northwestern dialects, as opposed to the well documented Juǀʼhoan dialects in the south(east); however speakers of nearly all dialects call themselves ǃKung.

The spellings ǃXun and ǃXuun seen in recent literature are related to the Juǀʼhoan form spelled ǃXʼu(u)n in the 1975 orthography, or ǃKu(u)n in current orthography. Additional spellings are ǃHu, ǃKhung, ǃKu, Kung, Qxü, ǃung, ǃXo, Xû, ǃXû, Xun, ǃXung, ǃXũũ, ǃXun, ʗhũ:, and additional spellings of Ju are Dzu, Juu, Zhu.

ǃXunthahli is the word for the language.

== Speakers ==
If the ǃKung dialects are counted together, they would make the third-most-populous click language after Khoekhoe and Sandawe. The most populous ǃKung variety, Juǀʼhoan, is perhaps tied for third place with Naro.

Estimates vary, but there are probably around 15,000 speakers. Counting is difficult because speakers are scattered on farms, interspersed with speakers of other languages, but Brenzinger (2011) counts 9,000 in Namibia, 2,000 in Botswana, 3,700 in South Africa and 1,000 in Angola (down from perhaps 8,000 in 1975).

Until the mid–late twentieth century, the northern dialects were widespread in southern and central Angola. However, most ǃKung fled the Angolan Civil War to Namibia (primarily to the Caprivi Strip), where they were recruited into the South African Defence Force special forces against the Angolan Army and SWAPO. At the end of the Border War, more than one thousand fighters and their families were relocated to Schmidtsdrift in South Africa amid uncertainty over their future in Namibia. After more than a decade living in precarious conditions, the post-Apartheid government bought and donated land for a permanent settlement at Platfontein, near Schmidtsdrift.

Only Juǀʼhoan is written, and it is not sufficiently intelligible with the Northwestern dialects for the same literature to be used for both.

== Classification ==
ǃKung constituted one of the branches of the putative Khoisan language family, and was called Northern Khoisan in that scenario, but the unity of Khoisan has never been demonstrated and is now regarded as spurious. Nonetheless, the anthropological term "Khoisan" has been retained as a term of convenience.

The only demonstrated relative of ǃKung is ǂʼAmkoe – see Kxʼa languages.

== Varieties ==
The better-known ǃKung dialects are Tsumkwe Juǀʼhoan, Ekoka ǃKung, ǃʼOǃKung, and ǂKxʼauǁʼein. Scholars distinguish between eleven and fifteen dialects, but the boundaries are unclear. There is a clear distinction between North/Northwest vs South/Southeast, but also a diverse Central group that is poorly attested.

=== Heine & Honken (2010) ===
Heine & Honken (2010) classify the 11 traditionally numbered dialects into three branches of what they consider a single language:

- ǃKung
  - Northern–Western ǃXun
    - Northern ǃXun
      - (N1) Maligo (ǃxuun, kúándò ǃxuun "Kwando ǃXuun"; SE Angola)
      - (N2) ǃʼOǃKung (ǃʼo ǃuŋ "Forest ǃXuun"; eastern C Angola)
    - Western ǃXun
      - (W1) — (ǃxūún, ǃʼālè ǃxòān "Valley ǃXuun"; Eenhana district, N Namibia)
      - (W2) ǀʼAkhwe (ǃxūún, ǀʼākhòè ǃxòān "Kwanyama ǃXuun"; Eenhana, N Namibia)
      - (W3) Tsintsabis (ǃxūún; Tsintsabis, Tsumeb district, N Namibia)
    - (K) Kavango ǃXuun (ǃxūún, known as dom ǃxūún "River ǃXuun" in Ekoka; Western Rundu district, N Namibia, & Angola adjacent)
  - Central ǃXun
    - (C1) Gaub (Tsumeb district, N Namibia)
    - (C2) Neitsas (Grootfontein district, N Namibia)
    - tentatively also the Tsintsabis, Leeunes and Mangetti (different from Mangetti Dune) dialects
  - Southeastern ǃXun
    - (E1) Juǀʼhoan (ju-ǀʼhoan(-si); Tsumkwe district, N Namibia, & Bots adjacent)
    - (E2) Dikundu (ǃxun, ju-ǀʼhoa(si); Dikundu, W Caprivi)
    - (E3) ǂKxʼauǁʼein (ju-ǀʼhoan(-si), ǃxun, ǂxʼāōǁʼàèn "Northern people"; Gobabis district, E Namibia)

Heine & König (2015, p. 324) state that speakers of all Northwestern dialects "understand one another to quite some extent" but that they do not understand any of the Southeastern dialects.

=== Sands (2010) ===
Sands (2010) classifies ǃKung dialects into four clusters, with the first two being quite close:

- ǃKung
  - Northern ǃKung: Southern Angola, around the Cunene, Cubango, Cuito, and Cuando rivers, but with many refugees now in Namibia:
    - ǃʼOǃKung
    - Maligo
  - North-Central ǃKung: Namibia, between the Ovambo River and the Angolan border, around the tributaries of the Okavango River east of Rundu to the Etosha Pan:
    - Tsintsabis
    - Okongo
    - Ovambo
    - Mpunguvlei
    - ǀʼAkhwe (Ekoka)
  - Central ǃKung: The area around Grootfontein, Namibia, west of the central Omatako River and south of the Ovambo River
  - Southeastern ǃKung: Botswana east of the Okavango Delta, and northeast Namibia from near Windhoek to Rundu, Gobabis, and the Caprivi Strip:
    - Tsumkwe
    - Omatako
    - Kameeldoring
    - Epukiro.

ǂKxʼauǁʼein was too poorly attested to classify at the time.

=== Snyman (1997) ===
A preliminary classification of the ǃXũũ and Žuǀ'hõasi dialects by Snyman (1997):

- ǃKung
  - Southern (Žuǀʼhõansi)
    - Epukiro Žuǀʼhõansi is bounded by the Omuramba Otjozondjou, stretching along the Omuramba Epukiro and north of the Sandfontein Omuramba up to Ghanzi in Botswana.
    - Tsumkwe Žuǀʼhõansi is spoken east of 20° longitude from the Omuramba Otjozondjou up to the Kaudom Omuramba and extending to Samagaigai in the west and 22° longitude in Botswana.
    - Rundu Žuǀʼhõansi presumably occurs south of the Okavango river from Rupara south-eastward to Ncaute and then north of the Omuramba Kaudom.
    - Omatako Žuǀʼhõansi consists of a northern dialect probably stretching from Ncaute southwards up to ca. 100 km South of Karakuwisa, and a southern dialect extending southwards to include the tributaries of the Omatako, viz. the Omambonde, Klein Omatako and Gunib. The dialects are probably spoken in an area about 40 km wide along the river. According to the map in Westhpal (1956), the upper reaches of the Gunib Omuramba as well as the Omuramba Otjozondjou, i.e. the area between Okozonduzu Omazera and Blignaut, was Haillom territory. This area roughly lies on the watershed between the Omatako and the Otjozondjou which served as a natural boundary between the Epukiro and Omatako Žuǀʼhõansi.
  - Central (ǃXũũ)
    - Grootfontein ǃXũũ is found in the district to the north-east, east and south-east of the town of Grootfontein.
    - Tsintsabis ǃXũũ is restricted to the North-eastern part of the Tsumeb district and adjacent areas in the western and eastern Mangetti.
    - Okongo ǃXũũ is found in the Okongo, Olokula, Ekoka and Otyolo area of Northeastern Owambo.
  - Northern (ǃXũũ)
    - Mpungu ǃXũũ occurs in the Tondoro and Mpungu area of the north-western Kavango and presumably in adjacent areas in Angola. This dialect clearly forms a transition from Okongo ǃXũũ to the other dialects of the Northern dialect cluster. Cuando/Quito ǃXũũ presumably belonged in the area between these rivers.
    - Quilo/Cubango ǃXũũ presumably belonged in the area between these rivers.
    - Cubango/Cunene ǃXũũ presumably belonged in the area between these rivers.

== Proto-language ==
Proto-ǃKung
- Reconstruction of: ǃKung languages

The ancestral language, Proto-Juu or Proto-ǃXuun, had five places of click articulation: dental, alveolar, palatal, alveolar lateral, and retroflex (*‼). The retroflex clicks have dropped out of Southeastern dialects such as Juǀʼhoan, but remain in Central ǃKung. In ǀʼAkhwe (Ekoka), the palatal click has become a fricated alveolar.

Proto-Juu	*ǃ 'belly'	*‼ 'water'	*ǂ
SE (Tsumkwe)	ᶢǃű	ᶢǃű	ǂ
N (Okongo/ǀʼAkhwe)	ᶢǃű	ᶢǁű	𝼋
NW (Mangetti Dune)	ᶢǃű	ᶢǁű	ǂ
C (Neitsas/Nurugas)	ᶢǃú	ᶢ𝼊ú	ǂ

== See also ==
- ǃKung lemmas (Wiktionary)
