= Uvularization =

Manner of secondary articulation

Uvularized

◌ʶ

◌ᵡ

Encoding
- Entity (decimal): &#694;
- Unicode (hex): U+02B6
Image

Uvularization or uvularisation is a secondary articulation of consonants or vowels by which the back of the tongue is constricted toward the uvula and upper pharynx during the articulation of a sound with its primary articulation elsewhere.

== IPA symbols ==
In the International Phonetic Alphabet, uvularization can be indicated by the symbol ⟨ʶ⟩ (a superscript voiced uvular fricative (inverted small capital R)) after the letter standing for the consonant that is uvularized, as in [tʶ] (the uvularized equivalent of [t]). This is specified in VoQS standards. The symbol ⟨ᵡ⟩ (a superscript voiceless uvular fricative) is sometimes used on voiceless consonants.

== Occurrence ==
Uvularized consonants are often not distinguished from pharyngealized consonants, and they may be transcribed as if they were pharyngealized.

In Arabic and several other Semitic and Berber languages, uvularization is the defining characteristic of the series of "emphatic" coronal consonants.

Uvularized consonants in standard Arabic are /sʶ/, /dʶ/, /tʶ/, /ðʶ/, /lʶ/. Regionally there is also /zʶ/ and /rʶ/. Other consonants, and vowels, may be phonetically uvularized.

In Greenlandic, long vowels are uvularized before uvular consonants, and English speakers retaining the Northumbrian Burr are reported to uvularize and retract vowels before a rhotic.
