= Kxʼa languages =

Language family

Kxʼa
- Ju–ǂHoan
- Geographic distribution: Angola, Namibia, and Botswana
- Linguistic classification: One of the world's primary language families
- Subdivisions: ǃKung (Juu); ǂʼAmkoe (ǂHoan)

Language codes
- Glottolog: kxaa1236
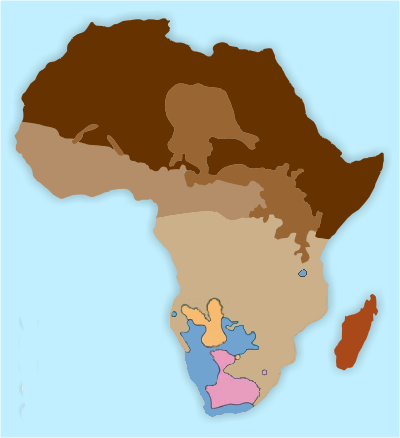
- Historical range of the Kxʼa languages in orange.

The Kxʼa (/ˈkɑː/ KAH) languages, also called Ju–ǂHoan (/ˌdʒuːˈhoʊæn/ joo-HOH-an), is a language family established in 2010 linking the ǂʼAmkoe (ǂHoan) language with the ǃKung (Juu) dialect cluster, a relationship that had been suspected for a decade. Along with the Tuu languages and Khoe languages, they are one of three language families indigenous to southern Africa, which are typologically similar due to areal effects.

== Languages ==
- ǂʼAmkoe (moribund)
- ǃKung (also ǃXun or Ju, formerly Northern Khoisan; a dialect cluster)

ǂʼAmkoe had previously been lumped in with the Tuu languages, perhaps over confusion with the dialect name ǂHȍȁn, but the only thing they have in common are typological features such as their bilabial clicks.

Honken & Heine (2010) coined the term Kxʼa for the family as a replacement for the rather inaccessible compound Ju–ǂHoan (easily confused with the Juǀʼhoan language), after the word for 'earth, ground', which is reconstructed as *kxʼà and is shared by the two branches of the family, though also by neighboring languages such as Kwadi.

== Reconstruction ==
Honken & Heine (2010) reconstruct six places of click articulation for Proto-Kxʼa: the five coronal places that occur in Central ǃKung, plus the bilabial clicks of ǂʼAmkoe. They postulate that the ancestral bilabial clicks became dental in ǃKung.

However, Starostin (2003) argues that the bilabial clicks are a secondary development in ǂʼAmkoe. He cites the ǂʼAmkoe words for 'one' and 'two', /ŋ͡ʘũ/ and /ʘoa/, where no other Khoisan language has a labial consonant of any kind in its words for these numerals.

Sands (2014) notes that ǂʼAmkoe bilabial clicks correspond to all clicks places in ǃKung except for palatal. She postulates that these reflect labialized clicks in Proto-Kxʼa: *ǀʷ *ǃʷ *𝼊ʷ *ǁʷ. These became bilabial in ǂʼAmkoe, while the only traces of the labialization in ǃKung are diphthongs. An example, from Proto-Kxʼa *𝼊ʷ, is 'tail' in ǂHoan /ʘχúì/, Juǀʼhoan /ǃxúi/ and Ekoka /ǁxóe/ (from Proto-Ju *𝼊xoe: retroflex clicks merged with alveolars in Southern ǃKung, with laterals in Northern ǃKung, and only remained retroflex in Central ǃKung.) The lack of **ǂʷ is not surprising, given the relative rarity of labiovelarized palatals crosslinguistically.
