= The Gods Must Be Crazy (film series) =

- Country: South Africa

The Gods Must Be Crazy is a series of films starring the Namibian San farmer Nǃxau ǂToma, and created by South African film director Jamie Uys.

== Official films ==
=== The Gods Must Be Crazy (1980) ===
The first film released in 1980, written and directed by Jamie Uys. Set in Botswana and South Africa, it tells the story of Xi, a San of the Kalahari Desert whose tribe discovers an empty Coca-Cola bottle. The bottle brings trouble to the tribe, and Xi is sent out into the unknown world beyond the Kalahari to return the bottle to the Gods by throwing the bottle off the world's end.

=== The Gods Must Be Crazy II (1989) ===
A sequel was released in 1989. Xi's name was changed to Xixo in this film. In it, Xixo's two young children, Xiri and Xisa encounter poachers in the Kalahari Desert, explore the back of their truck, and become unable to jump off once it starts moving. Xixo must once again travel great distances to retrieve them, and once again encounters various other western characters who are on quests of their own. The film is notable for the increased role of animals throughout the story, and for its light-hearted treatment of the civil war still raging in nearby Angola at the time.

== Unofficial films ==
In the early 1990s, Nǃxau was cast in three standalone Hong Kong comedy films that were filmed in Cantonese and then dubbed into English. Outside their country of origin, they were marketed as sequels to The Gods Must Be Crazy II.

These films were released on VCDs in China, but were never officially released in the United States. The Gods Must Be Funny in China was released on DVD in South Africa around 2008.

=== Crazy Safari (The Gods Must Be Crazy III) (1991) ===
A hopping vampire wreaks havoc in Nǃxau's tribe, but soon they discover how to handle him and he becomes a great asset to them. Meanwhile, a Chinese necromancer, sent by the corpse's descendants, searches for him, together with a bumbling cowardly representative charged with ensuring that the necromancer returns his ancestor as desired.

=== Crazy Hong Kong (The Gods Must Be Crazy IV) (1993) ===
N!xau accidentally hitches a ride with a Chinese businesswoman from the African plain to her home in Hong Kong. With only his natural instincts and desert-honed survival skills, the intrepid Bushman evades a gang of diamond thieves and stumbles into one comic mishap after another as he tries to find his way back home.

- Hong Kong Movie Database entry

=== The Gods Must Be Funny in China (The Gods Must Be Crazy V) (1994) ===
Hijinks ensue when Nǃxau travels to Beijing where he's recruited to accompany a track team on a week-long survival race through the Chinese wilderness.

- Hong Kong Movie Database entry
