= Afrasianist phonetic notation =

System of transcription for Arabic and related languages

Comparative work of the Afroasiatic languages uses a semi-conventionalized set of symbols that are somewhat different than the International Phonetic Alphabet and other phonetic notations. The more salient differences include the letters ⟨c, ʒ⟩ for IPA [ts, dz], the circumflex diacritic ⟨◌̂⟩ for lateral obstruents, and the sub-dot ⟨◌̣⟩ for emphatic consonants, which depending on the language may be ejective, implosive or pharyngealized.

== Conventions ==
=== Letters ===
Phonetic conventions are as follows:

Consonants
AA	IPA	AA	IPA
p̠, ḇ	[ɸ], [β]	ṗ, ḅ	[pˤ~pʼ], [bˤ~ɓ]
ṯ, ḏ	[θ], [ð]	ṯ̣, ḏ̣	[θˤ], [ðˤ]
ŝ	[ɬ]	ṣ	[sˤ~sʼ]
c, ʒ	[ts], [dz]	c̣	[tsʼ]
č, ǯ	[tʃ], [dʒ]	č̣	[tʃʼ]
ĉ, ʒ̂	[tɬ], [dɮ]	ĉ̣	[tɬʼ]
ḡ	[ɣ]	ḳ or q	[kˀ~kʼ]
x, 9	[kx], [ɡɣ]	x̣	[kxˀ~kxʼ]
ḫ, ɣ (γ)	[χ], [ʁ]	ḥ, ʕ	[ħ], [ʕ]
h	[h]	ʔ	[ʔ]
y or i̭	[j]	w or ṷ	[w]

⟨h̠⟩ is used only for Egyptian. Its value is not certain.

Sometimes IPA letters are used for the above, e.g. ⟨ħ⟩ for ⟨ḥ⟩, ⟨χ⟩ for ⟨ḫ⟩ or ⟨j⟩ for ⟨y⟩, or intermediate notation such as ⟨ṭṣ⟩ for ⟨c̣⟩ or ⟨ṭɬ̣⟩ for ⟨ĉ̣⟩.

Other consonants are familiar from the IPA or may be extended from the patterns in the table (e.g. ⟨ẓ⟩ for [zˁ], ⟨š⟩ for [ʃ], or ⟨q̣⟩ for [qʼ]).

Palatal/palatalized consonants are indicated with an acute accent: ⟨ś ṣ́ ź ć ć̣ ʒ́ ń ĺ ŕ⟩; retroflex often with a grave accent: ⟨l̀ ǹ⟩ etc.; and uvulars sometimes with an inverted breve: ⟨k̑ h̑⟩ etc. ⟨kʷ kᵒ⟩ may be distinguished as a labialized consonant vs a consonant followed by a rounded vowel.

There is some inconsistency between authors, often reflecting different phonetic interpretations, e.g. ⟨x⟩ for [x] and ⟨ḫ⟩ for [χ], or ⟨ḫ⟩ for [x] and ⟨x⟩ for [kx], or ⟨g⟩ for [ɡ] and ⟨ɡ⟩ for [ɢ].

Vowels

⟨ā, ī, ū, ē, ō⟩ are long vowels; ⟨ǎ, ǐ, ǔ⟩ etc. are short vowels. ⟨ə⟩ is a neutral vowel (schwa).

=== Symbols for reconstruction ===
Wildcards include:

- V for an undetermined vowel: {a, i, u};
- H for a laryngeal or pharyngeal consonant: {ḥ, ʕ, ʔ, h};
- S for a sibilant: {s, z, c, ʒ, č, ǯ, ṣ, c̣, č̣}.

Thus *bVr- is shorthand for "either *bar- or *bir- or *bur-".

- / means "or", e.g. *gaw/y- is *gaw- or *gay-.
- ( ) means "with or without", e.g. *ba(w)r- is *bawr- or *bar-.
- ~ means parallel proto-forms, e.g. *ʕad-at- ~ *ʕidd- means that the proto-form has two variant reconstructions.

== See also ==
- Proto-Afroasiatic language
