= Cursive forms of IPA letters =

Deprecated cursive forms of IPA symbols

Early specifications for the International Phonetic Alphabet included cursive forms of the letters designed for use in manuscripts and when taking field notes. However, the 1999 Handbook of the International Phonetic Association said:

There are cursive forms of IPA symbols, but it is doubtful if these are much in use today. They may have been of greater use when transcription by hand was the only way of recording speech, and so speed was essential. The cursive forms are harder for most people to decipher, and it is preferable to use handwritten versions which closely copy the printed form of the symbols.

== Development ==
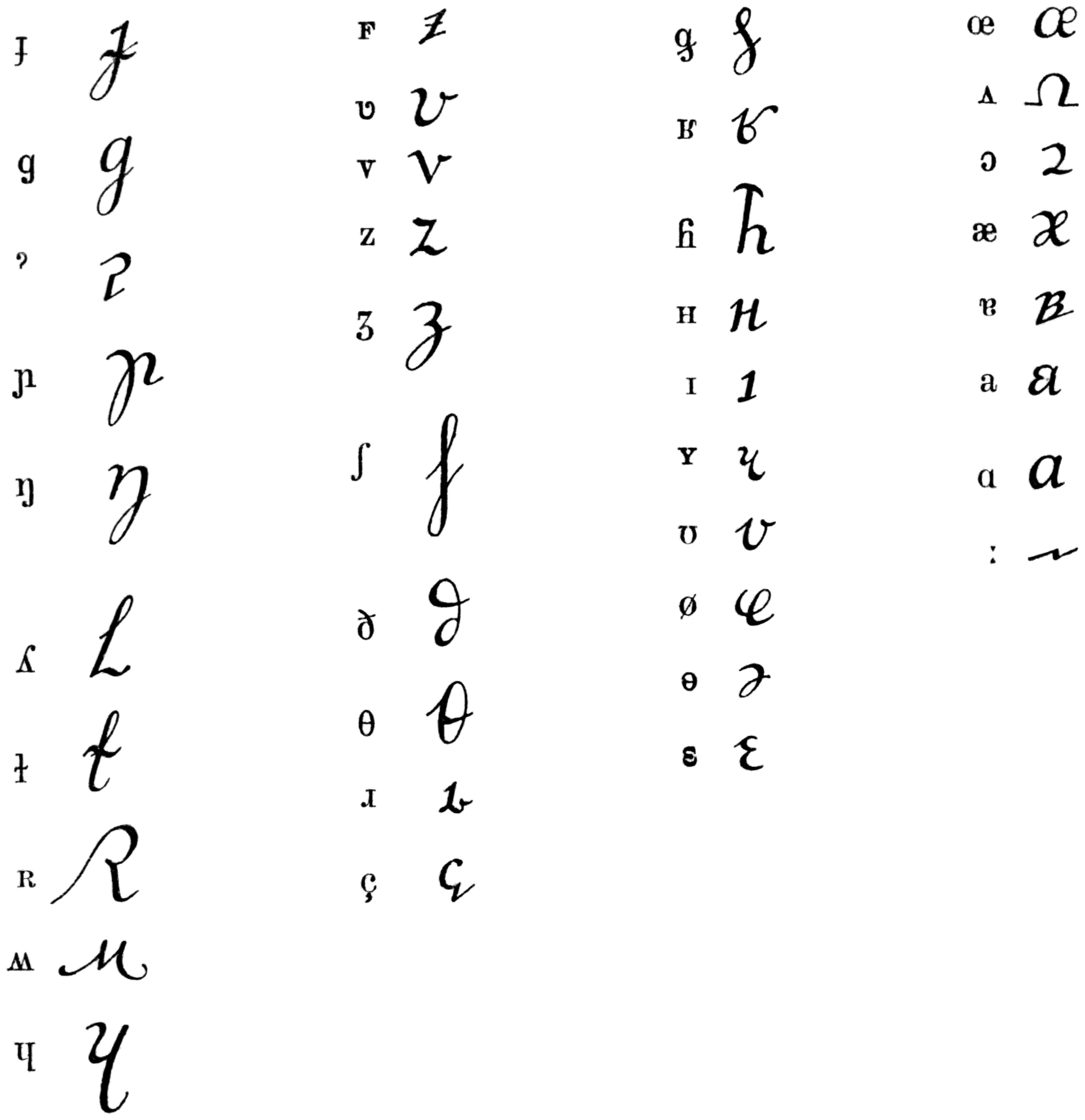
The cursive forms of the IPA presented in the 1912 edition of The principles of the International Phonetic Association. Two of these letters are obsolete: ⟨ǥ⟩ is now ⟨ɣ⟩, and ⟨ꜰ⟩ is now ⟨ɸ⟩.

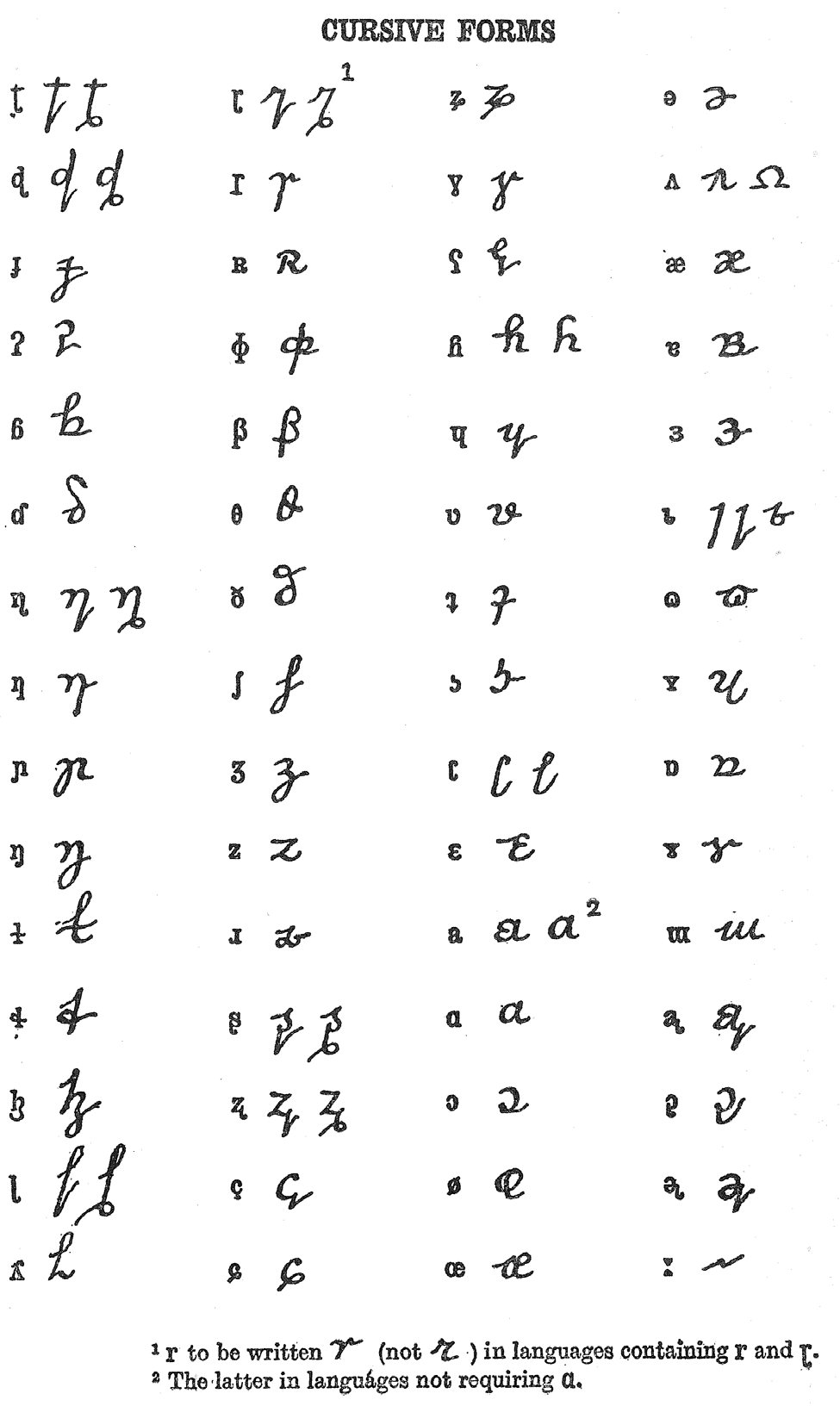
The cursive forms of the IPA presented in the 1949 edition. Several of these letters are obsolete: ⟨ƞ⟩ and ⟨ɼ⟩ have been removed; ⟨ʇ⟩, ⟨ʖ⟩, and ⟨ʗ⟩ are now ⟨ǀ⟩, ⟨ǁ⟩, and ⟨ǃ⟩; ⟨ɩ⟩ and ⟨ɷ⟩ are now ⟨ɪ⟩ and ⟨ʊ⟩; and the retroflex hook ⟨◌̢⟩ for r-colored vowels is now a rhotic hook ⟨◌˞⟩.

== Example ==
The following passage is from the 1912 handbook:

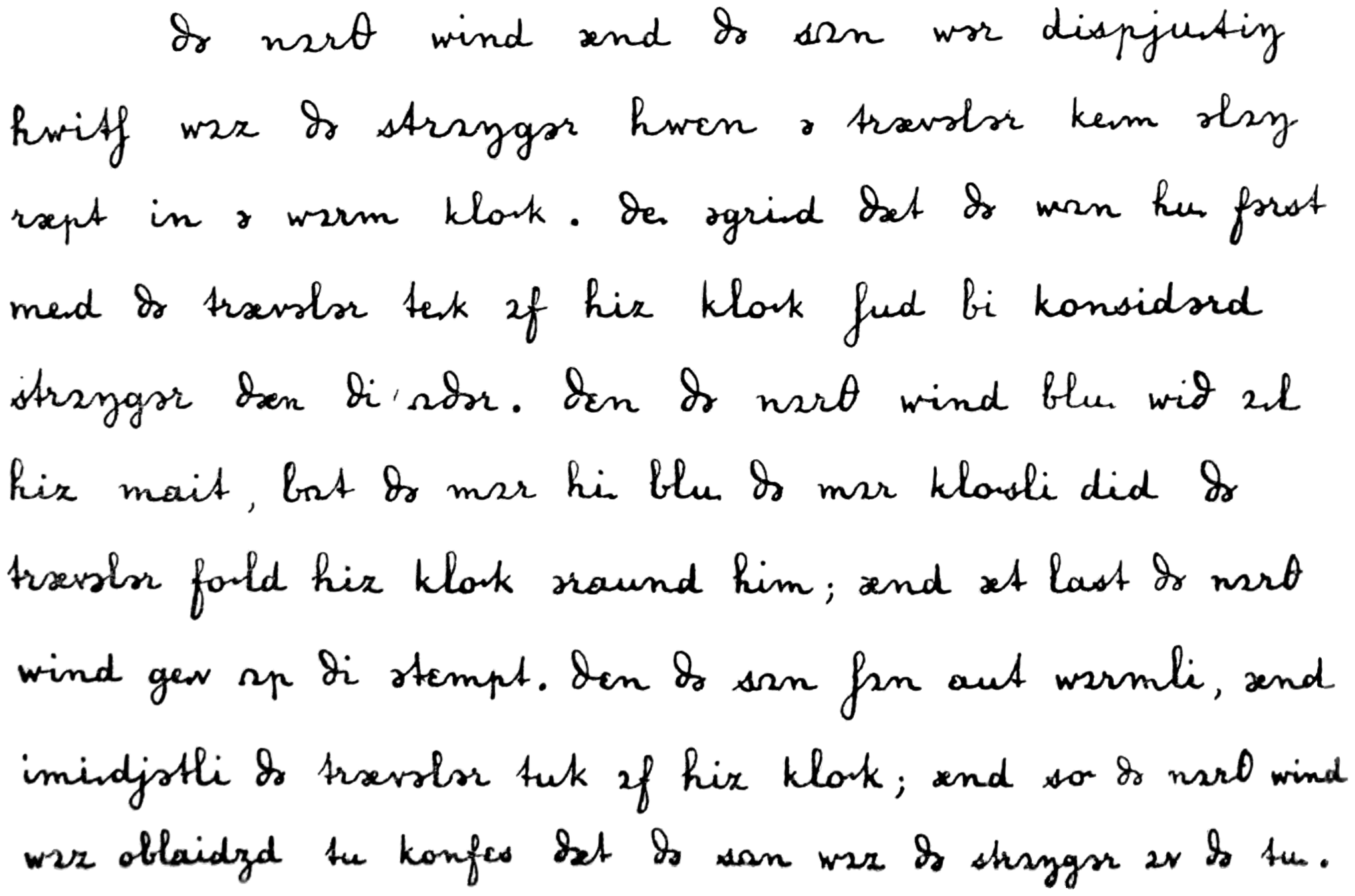
The North Wind and the Sun spoken in 'Northern English'

IPA

ðə nɔrθ wind ænd ðə sʌn wər dispjuːtiŋ
hwitʃ wɔz ðə strɔŋɡər hwɛn ə trævələr keːm əlɔŋ
ræpt in ə wɔrm kloːk. ðeː əɡriːd ðət ðə wʌn huː fərst
meːd ðə trævələr teːk ɔf hiz kloːk ʃud bi konsidərd
strɔŋɡər ðæn ði ʌðər. ðɛn ðə nɔrθ wind bluː wið ɔːl
hiz mait, bʌt ðə mɔr hiː bluː ðə mɔr kloːsli did ðə
trævələr foːld hiz kloːk əraund him; ænd æt lɑst ðə nɔrθ
wind ɡeːv ʌp ði ətɛmpt. ðɛn ðə sʌn ʃɔn aut wɔrmli, ænd
imiːdjətli ðə trævələr tuk ɔf hiz kloːk; ænd soː ðə nɔrθ wind
wɔz oblaidʒd tu konfɛs ðæt ðə sʌn wɔz ðə strɔŋɡər ɔv ðə tuː.

Orthography

The North Wind and the Sun were disputing
which was the stronger when a traveller came along
wrapped in a warm cloak. They agreed that the one who first
made the traveller take off his cloak should be considered
stronger than the other. Then the North Wind blew with all
his might, but the more he blew the more closely did the
traveller fold his cloak around him; and at last the North
Wind gave up the attempt. Then the Sun shone out warmly, and
immediately the traveller took off his cloak; and so the North Wind
was obliged to confess that the Sun was the stronger of the two.

== See also ==
- History of the International Phonetic Alphabet

Place →	Labial					Coronal										Dorsal					Laryngeal			
Manner ↓	Bilabial		Labiodental		Linguolabial		Dental		Alveolar		Postalveolar		Retroflex		(Alveolo-)palatal		Velar		Uvular		Pharyngeal/epiglottal		Glottal	
Nasal	m̥	m	ɱ̊	ɱ		n̼	n̪̊	n̪	n̥	n	n̠̊	n̠	ɳ̊	ɳ	ɲ̊	ɲ	ŋ̊	ŋ	ɴ̥	ɴ				
Plosive	p	b	p̪	b̪	t̼	d̼	t̪	d̪	t	d			ʈ	ɖ	c	ɟ	k	ɡ	q	ɢ	ʡ		ʔ	
Sibilant affricate							t̪s̪	d̪z̪	ts	dz	t̠ʃ	d̠ʒ	tʂ	dʐ	tɕ	dʑ								
Non-sibilant affricate	pɸ	bβ	p̪f	b̪v			t̪θ	d̪ð	tɹ̝̊	dɹ̝	t̠ɹ̠̊˔	d̠ɹ̠˔			cç	ɟʝ	kx	ɡɣ	qχ	ɢʁ	ʡʜ	ʡʢ	ʔh	
Sibilant fricative							s̪	z̪	s	z	ʃ	ʒ	ʂ	ʐ	ɕ	ʑ								
Non-sibilant fricative	ɸ	β	f	v	θ̼	ð̼	θ	ð	θ̠	ð̠	ɹ̠̊˔	ɹ̠˔	ɻ̊˔	ɻ˔	ç	ʝ	x	ɣ	χ	ʁ	ħ	ʕ	h	ɦ
Approximant		β̞		ʋ				ð̞		ɹ		ɹ̠		ɻ		j		ɰ						˷
Tap/flap		ⱱ̟		ⱱ					ɾ̥	ɾ			ɽ̊	ɽ						ɢ̆		ʡ̮		
Trill	ʙ̥	ʙ							r̥	r		r̠	ɽ̊r̥	ɽr					ʀ̥	ʀ	ʜ	ʢ		
Lateral affricate									tɬ	dɮ			tꞎ	d𝼅	c𝼆	ɟʎ̝	k𝼄	ɡʟ̝						
Lateral fricative							ɬ̪		ɬ	ɮ			ꞎ	𝼅	𝼆	ʎ̝	𝼄	ʟ̝						
Lateral approximant								l̪	l̥	l		l̠	ɭ̊	ɭ	ʎ̥	ʎ	ʟ̥	ʟ		ʟ̠				
Lateral tap/flap									ɺ̥	ɺ			𝼈̊	𝼈		ʎ̮		ʟ̆						

		BL	LD	D	A	PA	RF	P	V	U
Implosive	Voiced	ɓ			ɗ		ᶑ	ʄ	ɠ	ʛ
Implosive	Voiceless	ɓ̥			ɗ̥		ᶑ̊	ʄ̊	ɠ̊	ʛ̥
Ejective	Stop	pʼ			tʼ		ʈʼ	cʼ	kʼ	qʼ
Ejective	Affricate		p̪fʼ	t̪θʼ	tsʼ	t̠ʃʼ	tʂʼ	tɕʼ	kxʼ	qχʼ
Ejective	Fricative	ɸʼ	fʼ	θʼ	sʼ	ʃʼ	ʂʼ	ɕʼ	xʼ	χʼ
Ejective	Lateral affricate				tɬʼ			c𝼆ʼ	k𝼄ʼ	q𝼄ʼ
Ejective	Lateral fricative				ɬʼ					
Click (top: velar; bottom: uvular)	Tenuis	kʘ qʘ		kǀ qǀ	kǃ qǃ		k𝼊 q𝼊	kǂ qǂ		
Click (top: velar; bottom: uvular)	Voiced	ɡʘ ɢʘ		ɡǀ ɢǀ	ɡǃ ɢǃ		ɡ𝼊 ɢ𝼊	ɡǂ ɢǂ		
Click (top: velar; bottom: uvular)	Nasal	ŋʘ ɴʘ		ŋǀ ɴǀ	ŋǃ ɴǃ		ŋ𝼊 ɴ𝼊	ŋǂ ɴǂ	ʞ	
Click (top: velar; bottom: uvular)	Tenuis lateral				kǁ qǁ					
Click (top: velar; bottom: uvular)	Voiced lateral				ɡǁ ɢǁ					
Click (top: velar; bottom: uvular)	Nasal lateral				ŋǁ ɴǁ					
