= List of consonants =

This is a list of all the consonants which have a dedicated letter in the International Phonetic Alphabet, plus some of the consonants which require diacritics, ordered by place and manner of articulation.

IPA: Pulmonic consonants

Place →	Labial					Coronal										Dorsal					Laryngeal			
Manner ↓	Bilabial		Labiodental		Linguolabial		Dental		Alveolar		Postalveolar		Retroflex		(Alveolo-)palatal		Velar		Uvular		Pharyngeal/epiglottal		Glottal	
Nasal	m̥	m	ɱ̊	ɱ		n̼	n̪̊	n̪	n̥	n	n̠̊	n̠	ɳ̊	ɳ	ɲ̊	ɲ	ŋ̊	ŋ	ɴ̥	ɴ				
Plosive	p	b	p̪	b̪	t̼	d̼	t̪	d̪	t	d			ʈ	ɖ	c	ɟ	k	ɡ	q	ɢ	ʡ		ʔ	
Sibilant affricate							t̪s̪	d̪z̪	ts	dz	t̠ʃ	d̠ʒ	tʂ	dʐ	tɕ	dʑ								
Non-sibilant affricate	pɸ	bβ	p̪f	b̪v			t̪θ	d̪ð	tɹ̝̊	dɹ̝	t̠ɹ̠̊˔	d̠ɹ̠˔			cç	ɟʝ	kx	ɡɣ	qχ	ɢʁ	ʡʜ	ʡʢ	ʔh	
Sibilant fricative							s̪	z̪	s	z	ʃ	ʒ	ʂ	ʐ	ɕ	ʑ								
Non-sibilant fricative	ɸ	β	f	v	θ̼	ð̼	θ	ð	θ̠	ð̠	ɹ̠̊˔	ɹ̠˔	ɻ̊˔	ɻ˔	ç	ʝ	x	ɣ	χ	ʁ	ħ	ʕ	h	ɦ
Approximant		β̞		ʋ				ð̞		ɹ		ɹ̠		ɻ		j		ɰ						˷
Tap/flap		ⱱ̟		ⱱ					ɾ̥	ɾ			ɽ̊	ɽ						ɢ̆		ʡ̆		
Trill	ʙ̥	ʙ							r̥	r		r̠	ɽ̊r̥	ɽr					ʀ̥	ʀ	ʜ	ʢ		
Lateral affricate									tɬ	dɮ			tꞎ	d𝼅	c𝼆	ɟʎ̝	k𝼄	ɡʟ̝						
Lateral fricative							ɬ̪		ɬ	ɮ			ꞎ	𝼅	𝼆	ʎ̝	𝼄	ʟ̝						
Lateral approximant								l̪	l̥	l		l̠	ɭ̊	ɭ	ʎ̥	ʎ	ʟ̥	ʟ		ʟ̠				
Lateral tap/flap									ɺ̥	ɺ			𝼈̊	𝼈		ʎ̆		ʟ̆						

- IPA help
- audio
- full chart
- template

Symbols to the right in a cell are voiced, to the left are voiceless. Shaded areas denote articulations judged impossible.

IPA: Non-pulmonic consonants

		BL	LD	D	A	PA	RF	P	V	U
Implosive	Voiced	ɓ			ɗ		ᶑ	ʄ	ɠ	ʛ
Implosive	Voiceless	ɓ̥			ɗ̥		ᶑ̊	ʄ̊	ɠ̊	ʛ̥
Ejective	Stop	pʼ			tʼ		ʈʼ	cʼ	kʼ	qʼ
Ejective	Affricate		p̪fʼ	tθʼ	tsʼ	tʃʼ	tʂʼ	tɕʼ	kxʼ	qχʼ
Ejective	Fricative	ɸʼ	fʼ	θʼ	sʼ	ʃʼ	ʂʼ	ɕʼ	xʼ	χʼ
Ejective	Lateral affricate				tɬʼ			c𝼆ʼ	k𝼄ʼ	q𝼄ʼ
Ejective	Lateral fricative				ɬʼ					
Click (top: velar; bottom: uvular)	Tenuis	kʘ qʘ		kǀ qǀ	kǃ qǃ		k𝼊 q𝼊	kǂ qǂ		
Click (top: velar; bottom: uvular)	Voiced	ɡʘ ɢʘ		ɡǀ ɢǀ	ɡǃ ɢǃ		ɡ𝼊 ɢ𝼊	ɡǂ ɢǂ		
Click (top: velar; bottom: uvular)	Nasal	ŋʘ ɴʘ		ŋǀ ɴǀ	ŋǃ ɴǃ		ŋ𝼊 ɴ𝼊	ŋǂ ɴǂ	ʞ	
Click (top: velar; bottom: uvular)	Tenuis lateral				kǁ qǁ					
Click (top: velar; bottom: uvular)	Voiced lateral				ɡǁ ɢǁ					
Click (top: velar; bottom: uvular)	Nasal lateral				ŋǁ ɴǁ					

- IPA help
- audio
- full chart
- template
IPA: Co-articulated consonants
Nasal
nm
Labial–alveolar
ɳm
Labial–retroflex
ŋm
Labial–velar
Plosive
tp
db
Labial–alveolar
ʈp
ɖb
Labial–retroflex
kp
ɡb
Labial–velar
qʡ
Uvular–epiglottal
qp
Labial–uvular
Fricative/approximant
ɥ̊
ɥ
Labialized palatal
ʍ
w
Labialized velar
ɧ
Sj-sound (variable)
Lateral approximant
ɫ
Velarized alveolar
Implosive
kɓ̥
ɡɓ
Labial–velar
Ejective
tpʼ
Labial–alveolar

- IPA help
- full chart
- template

== Ordered by place of articulation ==
=== Labial consonants ===
(articulated by using the lips)

==== Bilabial consonants ====
- bilabial clicks e.g. [kʘ]
- bilabial nasal [m] (man)
- bilabial ejective [pʼ]
- voiced bilabial implosive [ɓ]
- voiceless bilabial plosive [p] (spin)
- voiced bilabial plosive [b] (bed)
- voiceless bilabial affricate [pɸ]
- voiced bilabial affricate [bβ]
- voiceless bilabial fricative [ɸ]
- voiced bilabial fricative [β]
- bilabial approximant [β̞]
- bilabial trill [ʙ]
- bilabial percussive [ʬ]

==== Labiodental consonants ====
- labiodental approximant [ʋ]
- labiodental nasal [ɱ] (symphony)
- voiced labiodental fricative [v] (van)
- Voiced labiodental plosive [b̪]
- Voiced labiodental affricate [b̪v]
- voiceless labiodental fricative [f] (fan)
- voiceless rounded velarized labiodental fricative [ɧ]
- Voiceless labiodental plosive [p̪]
- Voiceless labiodental affricate [p̪f]

=== Bidental consonants ===
- voiceless bidental fricative [h̪͆]

=== Coronal consonants ===
(articulated by using the tip of the tongue)

==== Dental consonants ====
- dental clicks e.g. [kǀ]
- dental lateral clicks e.g. [kǁ̪]
- dental ejective [t̪ʼ]
- dental nasal [n̪]
- voiced dental fricative [ð] (this)
- voiced dental implosive [ɗ̪]
- voiced dental plosive [d̪]
- voiceless bidental fricative
- voiceless dental fricative [θ] (thing)
- voiceless dental plosive [t̪]
- bidental percussive [ʭ]

==== Alveolar consonants ====
- alveolar lateral clicks e.g. [kǁ]
- alveolar approximant [ɹ] (red)
- alveolar ejective [tʼ]
- alveolar ejective fricative [sʼ]
- alveolar flap [ɾ]
- alveolar lateral approximant [l] (lead)
- alveolar lateral flap [ɺ]
- alveolar nasal [n] (none)
- alveolar trill [r]
- velarized alveolar lateral approximant [ɫ]
- voiced alveolar fricative [z] (zoo)
- voiced alveolar implosive [ɗ]
- voiced alveolar lateral fricative [ɮ]
- voiced alveolar plosive [d] (done)
- voiced alveolar affricate [d͡z]
- voiceless alveolar grooved fricative [s] (son)
- voiceless alveolar retroflex fricative [s̠]
- voiceless alveolar non-sibilant fricative [θ̠]
- voiceless alveolar lateral fricative [ɬ]
- voiceless alveolar plosive [t] (ton)
- voiceless alveolar affricate [t͡s]
- voiceless alveolar lateral affricate [t͡ɬ]
- ejective alveolar lateral affricate [t͡ɬʼ]
- voiced alveolar lateral affricate [d͡ɮ]

==== Postalveolar consonants ====
- (post)alveolar clicks e.g. [kǃ]
- voiced palato-alveolar affricate [dʒ] (jug)
- voiced palato-alveolar fricative [ʒ] (vision)
- voiceless palato-alveolar affricate [tʃ] (chip)
- voiceless palato-alveolar fricative [ʃ] (ship)

===== Palatalized postalveolar consonants =====
- voiced palatalized postalveolar fricative [ʑ]
- voiceless palatalized postalveolar fricative [ɕ]
- voiced palatalized postalveolar affricate [d͡ʑ]
- voiceless palatalized postalveolar affricate [t͡ɕ]

===== Retroflex consonants =====
- retroflex clicks e.g. [k𝼊 ] (commonly written ⟨[k‼]⟩)
- retroflex approximant [ɻ ]
- retroflex flap [ɽ]
- retroflex lateral flap [𝼈 ]
- retroflex lateral approximant [ɭ ]
- voiceless retroflex lateral fricative [ꞎ ]
- retroflex nasal [ɳ ]
- voiced retroflex fricative [ʐ ]
- voiced retroflex plosive [ɖ ]
- voiced retroflex affricate [d͜ʐ ]
- voiceless retroflex fricative [ʂ]
- voiceless retroflex plosive [ʈ]
- voiceless retroflex affricate [t͜ʂ],

=== Dorsal consonants ===
(articulated with the middle of the tongue)

==== Palatal consonants ====
- palatal clicks e.g. [kǂ]
- palatal approximant [j] (yes)
- palatal ejective [cʼ]
- palatal lateral approximant [ʎ]
- voiceless palatal lateral fricative [𝼆]
- palatal nasal [ɲ]
- voiced palatal fricative [ʝ]
- voiced palatal implosive [ʄ]
- voiced palatal plosive [ɟ]
- voiceless palatal fricative [ç] (human, but not hum)
- voiceless palatal plosive [c]
- voiceless palatal lateral affricate [c͡𝼆]
- ejective palatal lateral affricate [c͡𝼆ʼ]

===== Labialized palatal consonants =====
- labialized palatal approximant [ɥ] [jʷ]

==== Velar consonants ====
- velar approximant [ɰ]
- velar ejective [kʼ]
- velar lateral approximant [ʟ]
- voiceless velar lateral fricative [𝼄]
- voiced velar fricative [ɣ]
- voiced velar implosive [ɠ ]
- voiced velar plosive [ɡ] (get)
- voiceless velar fricative [x]
- voiceless velar plosive [k] (kick, cat)
- ejective velar lateral affricate [k͡𝼄ʼ]

===== Labialized velar consonants =====
- voiced labialized velar approximant [w] (witch)
- voiceless labialized velar approximant [ʍ] (which, in some dialects)

===== Labial–velar consonants =====
- voiceless labial–velar plosive [kp]
- voiced labial–velar plosive [ɡb]
- labial-velar nasal [ŋm]
- voiceless labial-velar implosive [ɠ̊͜ɓ̥]
- voiced labial-velar implosive [ɠ͡ɓ]

==== Uvular consonants ====
- uvular ejective [qʼ]
- uvular nasal [ɴ]
- uvular trill [ʀ]
- voiced uvular fricative [ʁ]
- voiced uvular implosive [ʛ]
- voiced uvular plosive [ɢ]
- voiceless uvular fricative [χ]
- voiceless uvular plosive [q]

===== Labial–uvular consonants =====
- voiceless labial–uvular plosive [qp]

=== Laryngeal consonants ===
(articulated with the throat)

==== Pharyngeal and epiglottal consonants ====
- pharyngeal plosive [ʡ]
- voiced upper-pharyngeal plosive [𝼂]
- voiceless upper-pharyngeal plosive [ꞯ]
- voiced pharyngeal fricative [ʕ]
- voiceless pharyngeal fricative [ħ]
- voiced pharyngeal trill [ʢ]
- voiceless pharyngeal trill [ʜ]

===== Uvular-epiglottal consonants =====
- voiceless uvular-epiglottal plosive [q͡ʡ]

==== Glottal consonants ====
- glottal plosive [ʔ]
- voiceless glottal affricate [ʔh]
- voiced glottal fricative [ɦ]
- voiceless glottal fricative [h]
- creaky-voiced glottal approximant [˷]

== Ordered by manner of articulation ==
Pulmonic consonants

=== Nasal (stop) consonants ===
- bilabial nasal [m]
- voiceless bilabial nasal [m̥]
- labiodental nasal [ɱ]
- dental nasal [n̪]
- alveolar nasal [n]
- voiceless alveolar nasal [n̥]
- retroflex nasal [ɳ ]
- voiceless retroflex nasal [ɳ̊ ]
- palatal nasal [ ɲ]
- voiceless palatal nasal [ ɲ̥]
- velar nasal [ŋ]
- voiceless velar nasal [ŋ̊]
- uvular nasal [ɴ]

=== Plosive (stop) consonants ===
- voiceless bilabial plosive [p]
- voiced bilabial plosive [b]
- voiceless dental plosive [t̪]
- voiced dental plosive [d̪]
- voiceless alveolar plosive [t]
- voiced alveolar plosive [d]
- voiceless retroflex plosive [ʈ]
- voiced retroflex plosive [ɖ]
- voiceless palatal plosive [c]
- voiced palatal plosive [ɟ]
- voiceless velar plosive [k]
- voiced velar plosive [ɡ]
- voiceless uvular plosive [q]
- voiced uvular plosive [ɢ]
- epiglottal plosive [ʡ]
- glottal plosive [ʔ]

=== Fricative consonants ===
Sibilant fricatives

- voiceless alveolar sibilant [s]
- voiced alveolar sibilant [z]
- voiceless palato-alveolar sibilant [ ʃ ]
- voiced palato-alveolar sibilant [ʒ]
- voiceless alveolo-palatal sibilant (palatalized postalveolar) [ɕ]
- voiced alveolo-palatal sibilant [ʑ]
- voiceless retroflex sibilant [ʂ]
- voiced retroflex sibilant [ʐ ]

Central non-sibilant fricatives

- voiceless bilabial fricative [ɸ]
- voiced bilabial fricative [β]
- voiceless labiodental fricative [f]
- voiced labiodental fricative [v]
- voiceless bidental fricative [h̪͆]
- voiceless dental fricative [θ]
- voiced dental fricative [ð]
- voiceless alveolar non-sibilant fricative [θ̠]
- voiced alveolar non-sibilant fricative [ɹ̝]
- voiceless palatal fricative [ç]
- voiced palatal fricative [ ʝ]
- voiceless velar fricative [x]
- voiced velar fricative [ɣ]
- voiceless uvular fricative [χ]
- voiceless pharyngeal fricative [ħ]
- voiceless epiglottal fricative [ʜ]
- voiceless palatal-velar fricative (not possible) [ɧ]

Lateral fricatives

- voiceless alveolar lateral fricative [ɬ]
- voiced alveolar lateral fricative [ɮ]
- voiceless retroflex lateral fricative [ꞎ ]
- voiceless palatal lateral fricative [𝼆])
- voiceless velar lateral fricative [𝼄])
- voiced velar lateral fricative [ʟ̝]

both fricatives and approximants

- voiced uvular fricative [ʁ]
- voiced pharyngeal fricative [ʕ]
- voiced epiglottal fricative [ʢ]

Pseudo-fricatives

- voiceless glottal fricative [h]
- voiced glottal fricative (murmured) [ɦ]

=== Affricate consonants ===
Sibilant affricates

- voiceless postalveolar affricate [tʃ]
- voiced postalveolar affricate [dʒ]
- voiceless alveolar affricate [ts]
- voiced alveolar affricate [dz]
- voiceless alveolo-palatal affricate [ʨ]
- voiced alveolo-palatal affricate [dʑ]
- voiceless retroflex affricate [tʂ]
- voiced retroflex affricate [dʐ]
- Fricated alveolar clicks [kǃᶴ] (also voiced, nasalized, etc.)

Non-sibilant affricates

- Voiceless bilabial affricate [pɸ]
- Voiceless bilabial-labiodental affricate [pf]
- Voiceless labiodental affricate [p̪f]
- Voiced labiodental affricate [b̪v]
- Voiceless dental affricate [t̪θ]
- Voiced dental affricate [d̪ð]
- Voiceless retroflex nonsibilant affricate [tɻ̝̊ ]
- Voiced retroflex nonsibilant affricate [dɻ̝ ]
- voiceless palatal affricate [cç]
- voiced palatal affricate [ɟʝ]
- Voiceless velar affricate [kx]
- Voiced velar affricate [ɡɣ]
- Voiceless uvular affricate [qχ]
- Voiced uvular affricate [ɢʁ]
- Voiceless epiglottal affricate [ʡʜ]

Lateral affricates

- voiceless alveolar lateral affricate [tɬ]
- voiced alveolar lateral affricate [dɮ]
- Voiceless palatal lateral affricate [c𝼆]
- Voiceless retroflex lateral affricate [tꞎ]
- Voiceless velar lateral affricate [k𝼄]
- Voiced velar lateral affricate [ɡʟ̝]

=== Approximant consonants ===
- bilabial approximant [β̞]
- labiodental approximant [ʋ]
- dental approximant [ð̞]
- alveolar approximant [ɹ]
- alveolar lateral approximant [l ]
- velarized alveolar lateral approximant [ɫ]
- retroflex approximant [ɻ ]
- retroflex lateral approximant [ɭ]
- palatal approximant [j]
- palatal lateral approximant [ʎ]
- nasal palatal approximant [ȷ̃]
- labialized palatal approximant [ɥ] [jʷ]
- velar approximant [ɰ]
- velar lateral approximant [ʟ]
- labialized velar approximant (voiced) [w]
- voiceless labialized velar approximant [ʍ]
- nasal labialized velar approximant [w̃]
- uvular approximant [ʁ̞]
- pharyngeal approximant [ʕ̞]
- epiglottal approximant [ʢ̞]
- voiced glottal approximant (murmured) [ɦ̞]
- voiceless glottal approximant [h̞]
- voiceless nasal glottal approximant [h̃]

=== Flap (tap) consonants ===
- bilabial flap [ⱱ̟]
- labiodental flap [ⱱ]
- alveolar flap [ɾ]
- alveolar lateral flap [ɺ]
- retroflex flap [ɽ]
- retroflex lateral flap [𝼈 ]
- palatal lateral flap [ʎ̮]
- uvular flap [ɢ̆]
- velar lateral flap [ʟ̆]
- epiglottal flap [ʡ̮]

=== Trill consonants ===
- bilabial trill [ʙ]
- alveolar trill [r]
- alveolar fricative trill [r̝]
- retroflex trill
- uvular trill [ʀ]
- epiglottal trill

=== Lateral consonants ===
Approximants

- Alveolar lateral approximant [l]
- Velarized alveolar lateral approximant [ɫ]

Fricatives

- Voiceless alveolar lateral fricative [ɬ]
- Voiced alveolar lateral fricative [ɮ]
- Voiceless retroflex lateral fricative [ꞎ ]
- Voiceless palatal lateral fricative [𝼆]
- Voiced velar lateral fricative [ʟ̝]
- Voiceless velar lateral fricative [𝼄]

Affricates

- Voiceless alveolar lateral affricate [tɬ]
- Voiced alveolar lateral affricate [dɮ]
- Voiceless palatal lateral affricate [c𝼆]
- Ejective palatal lateral affricate [c𝼆ʼ]
- Voiceless retroflex lateral affricate [tꞎ ]
- Ejective retroflex lateral affricate [tꞎʼ]
- Voiced velar lateral affricate [ɡʟ̝]
- Voiceless velar lateral affricate [k𝼄]
- Ejective velar lateral affricate [k𝼄ʼ]

Flaps

- Alveolar lateral flap [ɺ]
- Retroflex lateral flap [𝼈 ]
- Palatal lateral flap [ʎ̯]

Ejective

- Alveolar lateral ejective fricative [ɬʼ]

Clicks

- Dental lateral clicks e.g. [kǁ̪]
- Alveolar lateral clicks e.g. [kǁ]

=== Ejective consonants ===
Plosives

- bilabial ejective [pʼ]
- dental ejective [t̪ʼ]
- alveolar ejective [tʼ]
- retroflex ejective [ʈʼ]
- palatal ejective [cʼ]
- velar ejective [kʼ]
- uvular ejective [qʼ]

Affricates

- alveolar ejective affricate [t͜sʼ]
- palato-alveolar ejective affricate [t͜ʃʼ]
- retroflex ejective affricate [t͜ʂʼ]
- alveolo-palatal ejective affricate [t͜ɕʼ]
- dental ejective affricate [t͜θʼ]
- palatal lateral ejective affricate [c͜𝼆ʼ]
- velar ejective affricate [k͜xʼ]
- uvular ejective affricate [q͜χʼ]
- alveolar lateral ejective affricate [t͜ɬʼ]
- velar lateral ejective affricate [k͜𝼄ʼ]

Fricatives

- bilabial ejective fricative [ɸʼ]
- labiodental ejective fricative [fʼ]
- dental ejective fricative [θʼ]
- alveolar ejective fricative [sʼ]
- palato-alveolar ejective fricative [ ʃʼ]
- alveolo-palatal ejective fricative [ɕʼ]
- retroflex ejective fricative [ʂʼ]
- palatal ejective fricative [çʼ]
- velar ejective fricative [xʼ]
- uvular ejective fricative [χʼ]
- alveolar lateral ejective fricative [ɬʼ]

=== Implosive consonants ===
- voiced bilabial implosive [ɓ]
- voiceless bilabial implosive [ƥ]
- voiced dental implosive [ɗ̪ ]
- voiced alveolar implosive [ɗ ]
- voiceless alveolar implosive [ƭ]
- voiced retroflex implosive [ᶑ ]
- voiced palatal implosive [ ʄ ]
- voiceless palatal implosive [ƈ ]
- voiced velar implosive [ɠ ]
- voiceless velar implosive [ƙ]
- voiced uvular implosive [ʛ ]
- voiceless uvular implosive [ʠ ]

=== Labialized consonants ===
Plosives

- voiceless labialized velar plosive [kʷ]
- voiced labialized velar plosive [ɡʷ]
- Voiceless labialized labial-velar plosive [k͜pʷ]
- voiceless labialized uvular plosive [qʷ]
- voiced labialized uvular plosive [ɢʷ]

Fricatives

- voiceless labialized velar fricative [xʷ] [ʍ]
- voiced labialized velar fricative [ɣʷ]
- voiceless labialized uvular fricative [χʷ]
- voiced labialized uvular fricative [ʁʷ]

Approximants

- labialized palatal approximant [ɥ] [jʷ]
- (voiced) labialized velar approximant [w] [ɰʷ]
- voiceless labialized velar approximant [ʍ] [w̥]
- nasal labialized velar approximant [w̃]

=== Palatalized consonants ===
- voiced palatalized postalveolar fricative [ʑ]
- voiceless palatalized postalveolar fricative [ɕ]
- voiced palatalized postalveolar affricate [d̠͜ʑ]
- voiceless palatalized postalveolar affricate [t̠͜ɕ]
- voiceless palatalized velar plosive [kʲ]

=== Pharyngealized consonants ===
- voiceless pharyngealized alveolar sibilant [sˤ]
- voiced pharyngealized alveolar sibilant [zˤ]
- voiceless pharyngealized alveolar plosive [tˤ]
- voiced pharyngealized alveolar plosive [dˤ]
- voiceless pharyngealized dental fricative [θˤ]
- voiced pharyngealized dental fricative [ðˤ]
- voiceless pharyngealized alveolar lateral fricative [ɬˤ]
- voiced pharyngealized alveolar lateral fricative [ɮˤ]
- pharyngealized glottal stop [ʔˤ]
- pharyngealized alveolar lateral approximant [lˤ]
- pharyngealized alveolar nasal [nˤ]

=== Velarized consonants ===
- Voiceless velarized alveolar sibilant [sˠ]
- Voiced velarized dental fricative [ðˠ]
- Voiceless velarized alveolar plosive [tˠ]
- Velarized alveolar flap [ɾˠ]
- Voiceless velarized uvular plosive [qˠ]
- Voiceless velarized uvular fricative [χˠ]
- Voiced velarized uvular fricative [ʁˠ]
- Voiceless velarized alveolar lateral fricative [ɬˠ]
- Voiced velarized alveolar lateral fricative [ɮˠ]
- Velarized alveolar lateral approximant [ɫ] [lˠ]

=== Glottalized consonants ===
==== Reinforced airstream ====
- Voiceless labioglottal plosive[ʔᵖ]
- Voiceless alveologlottal plosive[ʔᵗ]
- Voiceless veloglottal plosive[ʔᵏ]

==== Blocked airstream ====
- Voiced glottalized alveolar nasal [nˀ]
- Voiced glottalized alveolar plosive [tˀ]
- Voiced glottalized dental fricative [ðˀ]

==== Restricted airstream ====
- Creaky-voiced bilabial nasal [m̰]

==== Whispery voice ====
- Breathy-voiced bilabial nasal [mʱ]
- Breathy-voiced bilabial plosive [bʱ]
- Breathy-voiced alveolar plosive [dʱ]
- Breathy-voiced velar plosive [gʱ]

=== Click consonants ===
The less common clicks, such as are found in Taa, are not included.

Simple clicks

- bilabial clicks (= ⟨ɋ⟩)
  - either velar:
  - voiceless bilabial click [ᵏʘ]
  - voiced bilabial click [ᶢʘ]
  - bilabial nasal click [ᵑʘ]
  - or uvular:
  - [𐞥ʘ], [𐞒ʘ], [ᶰʘ]
- dental clicks (= ⟨ʇ⟩)
  - either velar:
  - voiceless dental click [ᵏǀ]
  - voiced dental click [ᶢǀ]
  - dental nasal click [ᵑǀ]
  - or uvular:
  - [𐞥ǀ], [𐞒ǀ], [ᶰǀ]
- (post)alveolar click (= ⟨ʗ⟩)
  - either velar:
  - voiceless alveolar click [ᵏǃ]
  - voiced alveolar click [ᶢǃ]
  - alveolar nasal click [ᵑǃ]
  - or uvular:
  - [𐞥ǃ], [𐞒ǃ], [ᶰǃ]
- alveolar lateral clicks (= ⟨ʖ⟩)
  - either velar:
  - voiceless alveolar lateral click [ᵏǁ]
  - voiced alveolar lateral click [ᶢǁ]
  - alveolar lateral nasal click [ᵑǁ]
  - or uvular:
  - [𐞥ǁ], [𐞒ǁ], [ᶰǁ]
- retroflex clicks (= ⟨ψ⟩)
  - either velar:
  - voiceless retroflex click [ᵏ𝼊 ]
  - voiced retroflex click [ᶢ𝼊 ]
  - retroflex nasal click [ᵑ𝼊 ]
  - or uvular:
  - [𐞥𝼊 ], [𐞒𝼊 ], [ᶰ𝼊 ]
- palatal clicks (= ⟨ 𝼋 ⟩)
  - either velar:
  - voiceless palatal click [ᵏǂ]
  - voiced palatal click [ᶢǂ]
  - palatal nasal click [ᵑǂ]
  - or uvular:
  - [𐞥ǂ], [𐞒ǂ], [ᶰǂ]

Glottalized clicks

- velar (uvular clicks not shown):
- glottalized bilabial nasal click [ᵑ̊ʘˀ]
- glottalized dental nasal click [ᵑ̊ǀˀ]
- glottalized alveolar nasal click [ᵑ̊ǃˀ]
- glottalized alveolar lateral nasal click [ᵑ̊ǁˀ]
- glottalized retroflex nasal click [ᵑ̊𝼊ˀ]
- glottalized palatal nasal click [ᵑ̊ǂˀ]

Pulmonic-contour clicks

- voiceless bilabial linguo-pulmonic stop [ʘ͡q]
- voiced bilabial linguo-pulmonic stop [ʘ͡ɢ]
- voiceless dental linguo-pulmonic stop [ǀ͡q]
- voiced dental linguo-pulmonic stop [ǀ͡ɢ]
- voiceless alveolar linguo-pulmonic stop [ǃ͡q]
- voiced alveolar linguo-pulmonic stop [ǃ͡ɢ]
- voiceless alveolar lateral linguo-pulmonic stop [ǁ͡q]
- voiced alveolar lateral linguo-pulmonic stop [ǁ͡ɢ]
- voiceless retroflex linguo-pulmonic stop [𝼊͡q]
- voiced retroflex linguo-pulmonic stop [𝼊͡ɢ]
- voiceless palatal linguo-pulmonic stop [ǂ͡q]
- voiced palatal linguo-pulmonic stop [ǂ͡ɢ]
- voiceless bilabial linguo-pulmonic affricate [ʘ͡χ]
- voiced bilabial linguo-pulmonic affricate [ʘ͡ʁ]
- voiceless dental linguo-pulmonic affricate [ǀ͡χ]
- voiced dental linguo-pulmonic affricate [ǀ͡ʁ]
- voiceless alveolar linguo-pulmonic affricate [ǃ͡χ]
- voiced alveolar linguo-pulmonic affricate [ǃ͡ʁ]
- voiceless alveolar lateral linguo-pulmonic affricate [ǁ͡χ]
- voiced alveolar lateral linguo-pulmonic affricate [ǁ͡ʁ]
- voiceless retroflex linguo-pulmonic affricate [𝼊͡χ]
- voiced retroflex linguo-pulmonic affricate [𝼊͡ʁ]
- voiceless palatal linguo-pulmonic affricate [ǂ͡χ]
- voiced palatal linguo-pulmonic affricate [ǂ͡ʁ]

Ejective-contour clicks

- bilabial linguo-glottalic stop [ʘ͡qʼ]
- dental linguo-glottalic stop [ǀ͡qʼ]
- alveolar linguo-glottalic stop [ǃ͡qʼ]
- alveolar lateral linguo-glottalic stop [ǁ͡qʼ]
- retroflex linguo-glottalic stop [𝼊͡qʼ]
- palatal linguo-glottalic stop [ǂ͡qʼ]
- bilabial linguo-glottalic affricate [ʘ͡χʼ]
- dental linguo-glottalic affricate [ǀ͡χʼ]
- alveolar linguo-glottalic affricate [ǃ͡χʼ]
- alveolar lateral linguo-glottalic affricate [ǁ͡χʼ]
- retroflex linguo-glottalic affricate [𝼊͡χʼ]
- palatal linguo-glottalic affricate [ǂ͡χʼ]

=== Percussive consonants ===
The bilabial and bidental percussives are not found in any language, but occur as phonetic detail or through speech defects. However, the sublaminal or sublingual percussive is found in Sandawe and in some dialects of Gan Chinese.

- bilabial percussive [ʬ]
- bidental percussive [ʭ]
- Sublaminal lower-alveolar percussive [¡]

== See also ==
- Consonant
- Index of phonetics articles

Place →	Labial					Coronal										Dorsal					Laryngeal			
Manner ↓	Bilabial		Labiodental		Linguolabial		Dental		Alveolar		Postalveolar		Retroflex		(Alveolo-)palatal		Velar		Uvular		Pharyngeal/epiglottal		Glottal	
Nasal	m̥	m	ɱ̊	ɱ		n̼	n̪̊	n̪	n̥	n	n̠̊	n̠	ɳ̊	ɳ	ɲ̊	ɲ	ŋ̊	ŋ	ɴ̥	ɴ				
Plosive	p	b	p̪	b̪	t̼	d̼	t̪	d̪	t	d			ʈ	ɖ	c	ɟ	k	ɡ	q	ɢ	ʡ		ʔ	
Sibilant affricate							t̪s̪	d̪z̪	ts	dz	t̠ʃ	d̠ʒ	tʂ	dʐ	tɕ	dʑ								
Non-sibilant affricate	pɸ	bβ	p̪f	b̪v			t̪θ	d̪ð	tɹ̝̊	dɹ̝	t̠ɹ̠̊˔	d̠ɹ̠˔			cç	ɟʝ	kx	ɡɣ	qχ	ɢʁ	ʡʜ	ʡʢ	ʔh	
Sibilant fricative							s̪	z̪	s	z	ʃ	ʒ	ʂ	ʐ	ɕ	ʑ								
Non-sibilant fricative	ɸ	β	f	v	θ̼	ð̼	θ	ð	θ̠	ð̠	ɹ̠̊˔	ɹ̠˔	ɻ̊˔	ɻ˔	ç	ʝ	x	ɣ	χ	ʁ	ħ	ʕ	h	ɦ
Approximant		β̞		ʋ				ð̞		ɹ		ɹ̠		ɻ		j		ɰ						˷
Tap/flap		ⱱ̟		ⱱ					ɾ̥	ɾ			ɽ̊	ɽ						ɢ̆		ʡ̆		
Trill	ʙ̥	ʙ							r̥	r		r̠	ɽ̊r̥	ɽr					ʀ̥	ʀ	ʜ	ʢ		
Lateral affricate									tɬ	dɮ			tꞎ	d𝼅	c𝼆	ɟʎ̝	k𝼄	ɡʟ̝						
Lateral fricative							ɬ̪		ɬ	ɮ			ꞎ	𝼅	𝼆	ʎ̝	𝼄	ʟ̝						
Lateral approximant								l̪	l̥	l		l̠	ɭ̊	ɭ	ʎ̥	ʎ	ʟ̥	ʟ		ʟ̠				
Lateral tap/flap									ɺ̥	ɺ			𝼈̊	𝼈		ʎ̆		ʟ̆						

		BL	LD	D	A	PA	RF	P	V	U
Implosive	Voiced	ɓ			ɗ		ᶑ	ʄ	ɠ	ʛ
Implosive	Voiceless	ɓ̥			ɗ̥		ᶑ̊	ʄ̊	ɠ̊	ʛ̥
Ejective	Stop	pʼ			tʼ		ʈʼ	cʼ	kʼ	qʼ
Ejective	Affricate		p̪fʼ	tθʼ	tsʼ	tʃʼ	tʂʼ	tɕʼ	kxʼ	qχʼ
Ejective	Fricative	ɸʼ	fʼ	θʼ	sʼ	ʃʼ	ʂʼ	ɕʼ	xʼ	χʼ
Ejective	Lateral affricate				tɬʼ			c𝼆ʼ	k𝼄ʼ	q𝼄ʼ
Ejective	Lateral fricative				ɬʼ					
Click (top: velar; bottom: uvular)	Tenuis	kʘ qʘ		kǀ qǀ	kǃ qǃ		k𝼊 q𝼊	kǂ qǂ		
Click (top: velar; bottom: uvular)	Voiced	ɡʘ ɢʘ		ɡǀ ɢǀ	ɡǃ ɢǃ		ɡ𝼊 ɢ𝼊	ɡǂ ɢǂ		
Click (top: velar; bottom: uvular)	Nasal	ŋʘ ɴʘ		ŋǀ ɴǀ	ŋǃ ɴǃ		ŋ𝼊 ɴ𝼊	ŋǂ ɴǂ	ʞ	
Click (top: velar; bottom: uvular)	Tenuis lateral				kǁ qǁ					
Click (top: velar; bottom: uvular)	Voiced lateral				ɡǁ ɢǁ					
Click (top: velar; bottom: uvular)	Nasal lateral				ŋǁ ɴǁ					
