= Index of phonetics articles =

IPA: Pulmonic consonants

Place →	Labial					Coronal										Dorsal					Laryngeal			
Manner ↓	Bilabial		Labiodental		Linguolabial		Dental		Alveolar		Postalveolar		Retroflex		(Alveolo-)palatal		Velar		Uvular		Pharyngeal/epiglottal		Glottal	
Nasal	m̥	m	ɱ̊	ɱ		n̼	n̪̊	n̪	n̥	n	n̠̊	n̠	ɳ̊	ɳ	ɲ̊	ɲ	ŋ̊	ŋ	ɴ̥	ɴ				
Plosive	p	b	p̪	b̪	t̼	d̼	t̪	d̪	t	d			ʈ	ɖ	c	ɟ	k	ɡ	q	ɢ	ʡ		ʔ	
Sibilant affricate							t̪s̪	d̪z̪	ts	dz	t̠ʃ	d̠ʒ	tʂ	dʐ	tɕ	dʑ								
Non-sibilant affricate	pɸ	bβ	p̪f	b̪v			t̪θ	d̪ð	tɹ̝̊	dɹ̝	t̠ɹ̠̊˔	d̠ɹ̠˔			cç	ɟʝ	kx	ɡɣ	qχ	ɢʁ	ʡʜ	ʡʢ	ʔh	
Sibilant fricative							s̪	z̪	s	z	ʃ	ʒ	ʂ	ʐ	ɕ	ʑ								
Non-sibilant fricative	ɸ	β	f	v	θ̼	ð̼	θ	ð	θ̠	ð̠	ɹ̠̊˔	ɹ̠˔	ɻ̊˔	ɻ˔	ç	ʝ	x	ɣ	χ	ʁ	ħ	ʕ	h	ɦ
Approximant		β̞		ʋ				ð̞		ɹ		ɹ̠		ɻ		j		ɰ						˷
Tap/flap		ⱱ̟		ⱱ					ɾ̥	ɾ			ɽ̊	ɽ						ɢ̆		ʡ̆		
Trill	ʙ̥	ʙ							r̥	r		r̠	ɽ̊r̥	ɽr					ʀ̥	ʀ	ʜ	ʢ		
Lateral affricate									tɬ	dɮ			tꞎ	d𝼅	c𝼆	ɟʎ̝	k𝼄	ɡʟ̝						
Lateral fricative							ɬ̪		ɬ	ɮ			ꞎ	𝼅	𝼆	ʎ̝	𝼄	ʟ̝						
Lateral approximant								l̪	l̥	l		l̠	ɭ̊	ɭ	ʎ̥	ʎ	ʟ̥	ʟ		ʟ̠				
Lateral tap/flap									ɺ̥	ɺ			𝼈̊	𝼈		ʎ̆		ʟ̆						

- IPA help
- audio
- full chart
- template

Symbols to the right in a cell are voiced, to the left are voiceless. Shaded areas denote articulations judged impossible.

IPA: Non-pulmonic consonants

		BL	LD	D	A	PA	RF	P	V	U
Implosive	Voiced	ɓ			ɗ		ᶑ	ʄ	ɠ	ʛ
Implosive	Voiceless	ɓ̥			ɗ̥		ᶑ̊	ʄ̊	ɠ̊	ʛ̥
Ejective	Stop	pʼ			tʼ		ʈʼ	cʼ	kʼ	qʼ
Ejective	Affricate		p̪fʼ	t̪θʼ	tsʼ	t̠ʃʼ	tʂʼ	tɕʼ	kxʼ	qχʼ
Ejective	Fricative	ɸʼ	fʼ	θʼ	sʼ	ʃʼ	ʂʼ	ɕʼ	xʼ	χʼ
Ejective	Lateral affricate				tɬʼ			c𝼆ʼ	k𝼄ʼ	q𝼄ʼ
Ejective	Lateral fricative				ɬʼ					
Click (top: velar; bottom: uvular)	Tenuis	kʘ qʘ		kǀ qǀ	kǃ qǃ		k𝼊 q𝼊	kǂ qǂ		
Click (top: velar; bottom: uvular)	Voiced	ɡʘ ɢʘ		ɡǀ ɢǀ	ɡǃ ɢǃ		ɡ𝼊 ɢ𝼊	ɡǂ ɢǂ		
Click (top: velar; bottom: uvular)	Nasal	ŋʘ ɴʘ		ŋǀ ɴǀ	ŋǃ ɴǃ		ŋ𝼊 ɴ𝼊	ŋǂ ɴǂ	ʞ	
Click (top: velar; bottom: uvular)	Tenuis lateral				kǁ qǁ					
Click (top: velar; bottom: uvular)	Voiced lateral				ɡǁ ɢǁ					
Click (top: velar; bottom: uvular)	Nasal lateral				ŋǁ ɴǁ					

- IPA help
- audio
- full chart
- template

Shaded areas denote articulations judged impossible.

IPA: Co-articulated consonants
Nasal
n͡m
Labial–alveolar
ɳ͡m
Labial–retroflex
ŋ͡m
Labial–velar
Plosive
t͡p
d͡b
Labial–alveolar
ʈ͡p
ɖ͡b
Labial–retroflex
k͡p
ɡ͡b
Labial–velar
q͡ʡ
Uvular–epiglottal
q͡p
Labial–uvular
Fricative/approximant
ɥ̊
ɥ
Labialized palatal
ʍ
w
Labialized velar
ɧ
Sj-sound (variable)
Lateral approximant
ɫ
Velarized alveolar
Implosive
ɠ̊͜ɓ̥
ɠ͡ɓ
Labial–velar
Ejective
t͡pʼ
Labial–alveolar

- IPA help
- full chart
- template
IPA: Vowels

	Front	Central	Back
Close	i y	ɨ ʉ	ɯ u
Near-close	ɪ ʏ		ʊ
Close-mid	e ø	ɘ ɵ	ɤ o
Mid	e̞ ø̞	ə	ɤ̞ o̞
Open-mid	ɛ œ	ɜ ɞ	ʌ ɔ
Near-open	æ	ɐ
Open	a ɶ	ä	ɑ ɒ

- IPA help
- audio
- full chart
- template

Legend: unrounded • rounded

== A ==
- Acoustic phonetics
- Active articulator
- Affricate
- Airstream mechanism
- Alexander John Ellis
- Alexander Melville Bell
- Alfred C. Gimson
- Allophone
- Alveolar approximant (ɹ)
- Alveolar click (ǃ)
- Alveolar consonant
- Alveolar ejective (tʼ)
- Alveolar ejective affricate (tsʼ)
- Alveolar ejective fricative (sʼ)
- Alveolar flap (ɾ)
- Alveolar lateral approximant (l, l̥)
- Alveolar lateral ejective affricate (tɬʼ)
- Alveolar lateral ejective fricative (ɬʼ)
- Alveolar lateral flap (ɺ)
- Alveolar nasal (n)
- Alveolar ridge
- Alveolar trill (r, r̥)
- Alveolo-palatal consonant
- Alveolo-palatal ejective fricative (ɕʼ)
- Apical consonant
- Approximant consonant
- Articulatory phonetics
- Aspirated consonant (◌ʰ)
- Auditory phonetics

== B ==
- Back vowel
- Basis of articulation
- Bernd J. Kröger
- Bilabial click (ʘ)
- Bilabial consonant
- Bilabial ejective (pʼ)
- Bilabial flap (ⱱ̟)
- Bilabial nasal (m)
- Bilabial trill (ʙ)
- Breathy voice
- Bidental consonant

== C ==
- Cardinal vowel
- Central vowel
- Checked vowel
- Click consonant
- Close back rounded vowel (u)
- Close back unrounded vowel (ɯ)
- Close central rounded vowel (ʉ)
- Close central unrounded vowel (ɨ)
- Close front rounded vowel (y)
- Close front unrounded vowel (i)
- Close vowel
- Close-mid back rounded vowel (o)
- Close-mid back unrounded vowel (ɤ)
- Close-mid central rounded vowel (ɵ)
- Close-mid central unrounded vowel (ɘ)
- Close-mid front rounded vowel (ø)
- Close-mid front unrounded vowel (e)
- Close-mid vowel
- Co-articulated consonant
- Coarticulation
- Comparison of ASCII encodings of the International Phonetic Alphabet
- Consonant
- Consonant cluster
- Continuant
- Creaky voice

== D ==
- Daniel Jones
- David Abercrombie
- Dental click (ǀ)
- Dental consonant
- Dental ejective (t̪ʼ)
- Dental ejective fricative (θʼ)
- Dental nasal (n̪)
- Diphthong
- Dorsal consonant

== E ==
- Eclipsis
- Ejective consonant
- Eli Fischer-Jørgensen
- Elision
- Epenthesis
- Epiglottal consonant
- Epiglottal flap (ʡ̯)
- Epiglottal plosive (ʡ)
- Epiglottal trill (ʢ)

== F ==
- Formant
- Fortis (phonetics)
- Fortis and lenis
- Free vowel
- Fricative consonant
- Front vowel

== G ==
- Gemination
- Georg Heike
- Glide
- Glottis
- Glottal consonant
- Glottalic consonant (ingressive, egressive)
- Glottal stop (ʔ)

== H ==
- Hard palate
- Henry Sweet
- High rising terminal
- Hush consonant

== I ==
- Ian Maddieson
- Ilse Lehiste
- Implosive consonant
- Ingressive speech
- International Phonetic Alphabet
- International Phonetic Association
- Intonation

== J ==
- J. C. Catford
- John C. Wells
- John Laver
- John Local
- John Ohala
- John Samuel Kenyon

== K ==
- Kenneth Lee Pike
- Kenneth N. Stevens

== L ==
- Labialization
- Labial-palatal approximant (ɥ)
- Labial-palatal consonant
- Labial-uvular consonant
- Labial-uvular plosive (q͡p)
- Labial-velar approximant (w)
- Labial-velar consonant
- Labial-velar nasal (ŋ͡m)
- Labiodental approximant (ʋ)
- Labiodental consonant
- Labiodental ejective fricative (fʼ)
- Labiodental flap (ⱱ)
- Labiodental nasal (ɱ)
- Lateral click (ǁ)
- Laminal consonant
- Lateral consonant
- Length (phonetics)
- Lenis
- Lexical stress
- Lilias Armstrong
- Linguolabial consonant
- Lips
- Liquid consonant
- List of consonants
- List of vowels
- Luciano Canepari
- Ludmilla A. Chistovich

== M ==
- Manner of articulation
- Mark Liberman
- Median consonant
- Metathesis
- Mid central vowel (ə)
- Mid vowel
- Monophthong

== N ==
- Nasal consonant
- Nasal stop
- Nasal vowel
- Nasalization
- Near-close back rounded vowel (ʊ)
- Near-close front rounded vowel (ʏ)
- Near-close front unrounded vowel (ɪ)
- Near-close vowel
- Near-open central vowel (ɐ)
- Near-open front unrounded vowel (æ)
- Near-open vowel

== O ==
- Obsolete and nonstandard symbols in the International Phonetic Alphabet
- Occlusion
- Open back rounded vowel (ɒ)
- Open back unrounded vowel (ɑ)
- Open front rounded vowel (ɶ)
- Open front unrounded vowel (a)
- Open vowel
- Open-mid back rounded vowel (ɔ)
- Open-mid back unrounded vowel (ʌ)
- Open-mid central rounded vowel (ɞ)
- Open-mid central unrounded vowel (ɜ)
- Open-mid front rounded vowel (œ)
- Open-mid front unrounded vowel (ɛ)
- Open-mid vowel
- Oral consonant

== P ==
- Palatal approximant (j, j̊)
- Palatal click (ǂ)
- Palatal consonant
- Palatal ejective (cʼ)
- Palatal lateral approximant (ʎ)
- Palatal lateral ejective affricate (cʎ̝̥ʼ)
- Palatal lateral flap (ʎ̯)
- Palatal nasal (ɲ, ɲ̟)
- Palatalization
- Palato-alveolar ejective affricate (tʃʼ)
- Palato-alveolar ejective fricative (ʃʼ)
- Palatography
- Pāṇini
- Passive articulator
- Peter Ladefoged
- Peter Roach (phonetician)
- Pharyngeal consonant
- Pharyngealization
- Philip Lieberman
- Phonation
- Phone
- Phoneme
- Phonetic palindrome
- Phonetics
- Phonetic transcription
- Pitch accent
- Place of articulation
- Plosive consonant
- Postalveolar consonant
- Postalveolar nasal (n̠)
- Preaspiration
- Prenasalized consonant
- Prosody
- Pulmonic egressive

== R ==
- R-colored vowel
- Retroflex approximant (ɻ)
- Retroflex click (‼)
- Retroflex consonant
- Retroflex ejective (ʈʼ)
- Retroflex ejective affricate (ʈʂʼ)
- Retroflex ejective fricative (ʂʼ)
- Retroflex flap (ɽ)
- Retroflex nasal (ɳ)
- Retroflex lateral approximant (ɭ)
- Retroflex lateral flap (ɺ̢)
- Retroflex trill (ɽr)
- Rhotic consonant
- Rounded vowel

== S ==
- Sandhi
- SAMPA
- Semivowel
- Sibilant consonant
- Sj-sound (ɧ)
- Slack voice
- Jennifer Smith (sociolinguist)
- Sociophonetics
- Sonorant
- Source–filter model of speech production
- Spectrogram
- Speech organ
- Speech perception
- Stress accent
- Stress (linguistics)
- Stricture
- Syllable
- Syncope

== T ==
- Table of vowels
- Tap or flap consonant
- Teeth
- Tenseness
- Tonal language
- Tone sandhi
- Tongue
- Trill consonant
- Triphthong

== U ==
- Unrounded vowel
- Uvula
- Uvular consonant
- Uvular ejective (qʼ)
- Uvular ejective affricate (qχʼ)
- Uvular ejective fricative (χʼ)
- Uvular flap (ɢ̆)
- Uvular nasal (ɴ)
- Uvular trill (ʀ)

== V ==
- Velar approximant (ɰ)
- Velar consonant
- Velar ejective (kʼ)
- Velar ejective affricate (kxʼ)
- Velar ejective fricative (xʼ)
- Velar lateral approximant (ʟ)
- Velar lateral ejective affricate (kʟ̝̊ʼ)
- Velar lateral flap (ʟ̆)
- Velar nasal (ŋ)
- Velaric egressive
- Velarization
- Velum
- Vocal cords
- Vocal stress
- Vocal tract
- Voice onset time
- Voiced alveolar affricate (dz)
- Voiced alveolar fricative (z, ð̠)
- Voiced alveolar implosive (ɗ)
- Voiced alveolar lateral affricate (dɮ)
- Voiced alveolar lateral fricative (ɮ)
- Voiced alveolar plosive (d)
- Voiced alveolo-palatal affricate (dʑ)
- Voiced alveolo-palatal fricative (ʑ)
- Voiced bilabial fricative (β)
- Voiced bilabial implosive (ɓ)
- Voiced bilabial plosive (b)
- Voiced consonant
- Voiced dental affricate (d̪z̪, dð)
- Voiced dental fricative (z̪), (ð)
- Voiced dental plosive (d̪)
- Voiced epiglottal fricative (ʢ)
- Voiced glottal fricative (ɦ)
- Voiced implosive consonant
- Voiced labial-velar plosive (ɡ͡b)
- Voiced labiodental affricate (b̪v)
- Voiced labiodental fricative (v)
- Voiced labiodental plosive (b̪)
- Voiced palatal affricate (ɟʝ)
- Voiced palatal fricative (ʝ)
- Voiced palatal implosive (ʄ)
- Voiced palatal plosive (ɟ)
- Voiced palato-alveolar affricate (dʒ)
- Voiced pharyngeal fricative (ʕ)
- Voiced postalveolar fricative (ʒ)
- Voiced retroflex affricate (ɖʐ)
- Voiced retroflex fricative (ʐ)
- Voiced retroflex implosive (ᶑ)
- Voiced retroflex plosive (ɖ)
- Voiced uvular affricate (ɢʁ)
- Voiced uvular fricative (ʁ)
- Voiced uvular implosive (ʛ)
- Voiced uvular plosive (ɢ)
- Voiced velar affricate (ɡɣ)
- Voiced velar fricative (ɣ)
- Voiced velar implosive (ɠ)
- Voiced velar lateral affricate (ɡʟ̝)
- Voiced velar lateral fricative (ʟ̝)
- Voiced velar plosive (ɡ)
- Voiceless alveolar affricate (ts)
- Voiceless alveolar fricative (s, θ̠)
- Voiceless alveolar lateral affricate (tɬ)
- Voiceless alveolar lateral fricative (ɬ)
- Voiceless alveolar nasal (n̥)
- Voiceless alveolar plosive (t)
- Voiceless alveolo-palatal affricate (tɕ)
- Voiceless alveolo-palatal fricative (ɕ)
- Voiceless bilabial fricative (ɸ)
- Voiceless bilabial nasal (m̥)
- Voiceless bilabial plosive (p)
- Voiceless consonant
- Voiceless dental affricate (t̪s̪, tθ)
- Voiceless dental fricative (s̪, θ)
- Voiceless dental plosive (t̪)
- Voiceless epiglottal fricative (ʜ)
- Voiceless glottal fricative (h)
- Voiceless labial-velar fricative (ʍ)
- Voiceless labial-velar plosive (k͡p)
- Voiceless labiodental affricate (p̪f)
- Voiceless labiodental fricative (f)
- Voiceless labiodental plosive (p̪)
- Voiceless palatal affricate (cç)
- Voiceless palatal fricative (ç)
- Voiceless palatal lateral affricate (cʎ̥˔)
- Voiceless palatal lateral fricative (ʎ̝̊)
- Voiceless palatal nasal (ɲ̊)
- Voiceless palatal plosive (c)
- Voiceless pharyngeal fricative (ħ)
- Voiceless postalveolar affricate (tʃ)
- Voiceless postalveolar fricative (ʃ)
- Voiceless retroflex affricate (ʈʂ)
- Voiceless retroflex fricative (ʂ)
- Voiceless retroflex lateral fricative (ꞎ)
- Voiceless retroflex nasal (ɳ̊)
- Voiceless retroflex plosive (ʈ)
- Voiceless retroflex trill (ɽr̥)
- Voiceless uvular affricate (qχ)
- Voiceless uvular fricative (χ)
- Voiceless uvular nasal (ɴ̥)
- Voiceless uvular plosive (q)
- Voiceless uvular trill (ʀ̥)
- Voiceless velar affricate (kx)
- Voiceless velar fricative (x)
- Voiceless velar lateral affricate (kʟ̝̊)
- Voiceless velar lateral fricative (ʟ̝̊)
- Voiceless velar nasal (ŋ̊)
- Voiceless velar plosive (k)
- Voicing
- Vowel
- Vowel backness
- Vowel harmony
- Vowel height
- Vowel hiatus
- Vowel length
- Vowel reduction
- Vowel roundedness

== W ==
- Whispering

== X ==
- X-SAMPA

== Y ==
- Yi Tso-lin
