= Table of vowels =

Vowels defined by the International Phonetic Association

This table lists the vowel letters of the International Phonetic Alphabet.

IPA: Vowels

	Front	Central	Back
Close	i y	ɨ ʉ	ɯ u
Near-close	ɪ ʏ		ʊ
Close-mid	e ø	ɘ ɵ	ɤ o
Mid	e̞ ø̞	ə	ɤ̞ o̞
Open-mid	ɛ œ	ɜ ɞ	ʌ ɔ
Near-open	æ	ɐ
Open	a ɶ	ä	ɑ ɒ

- IPA help
- audio
- full chart
- template

Legend: unrounded • rounded

name	height	backness	roundness	IPA number	IPA text	IPA image	Entity	X-SAMPA	Sound sample
Close front unrounded vowel	close	front	unrounded	301	i		&#105;	i	Sound sample
Close front rounded vowel	close	front	rounded	309	y		&#121;	y	Sound sample
Close central unrounded vowel	close	central	unrounded	317	ɨ		&#616;	1	Sound sample
Close central rounded vowel	close	central	rounded	318	ʉ		&#649;	}	Sound sample
Close back unrounded vowel	close	back	unrounded	316	ɯ		&#623;	M	Sound sample
Close back rounded vowel	close	back	rounded	308	u		&#117;	u	Sound sample
Near-close front unrounded vowel	near-close	front	unrounded	319	ɪ		&#618;	I	Sound sample
Near-close front rounded vowel	near-close	front	rounded	320	ʏ		&#655;	Y	Sound sample
Near-close back rounded vowel	near-close	back	rounded	321	ʊ		&#650;	U	Sound sample
Close-mid front unrounded vowel	close-mid	front	unrounded	302	e		&#101;	e	Sound sample
Close-mid front rounded vowel	close-mid	front	rounded	310	ø		&#248;	2	Sound sample
Close-mid central unrounded vowel	close-mid	central	unrounded	397	ɘ		&#600;	@\	Sound sample
Close-mid central rounded vowel	close-mid	central	rounded	323	ɵ		&#629;	8	Sound sample
Close-mid back unrounded vowel	close-mid	back	unrounded	315	ɤ		&#612;	7	Sound sample
Close-mid back rounded vowel	close-mid	back	rounded	307	o		&#111;	o	Sound sample
Mid central vowel	mid	central	undefined	322	ə		&#601;	@	Sound sample
Open-mid front unrounded vowel	open-mid	front	unrounded	303	ɛ		&#603;	E	Sound sample
Open-mid front rounded vowel	open-mid	front	rounded	311	œ		&#339;	9	Sound sample
Open-mid central unrounded vowel	open-mid	central	unrounded	326	ɜ		&#604;	3	Sound sample
Open-mid central rounded vowel	open-mid	central	rounded	395	ɞ		&#606;	3\	Sound sample
Open-mid back unrounded vowel	open-mid	back	unrounded	314	ʌ		&#652;	V	Sound sample
Open-mid back rounded vowel	open-mid	back	rounded	306	ɔ		&#596;	O	Sound sample
Near-open front unrounded vowel	near-open	front	unrounded	325	æ		&#230;	{	Sound sample
Near-open central vowel	near-open	central	undefined	324	ɐ		&#592;	6	Sound sample
Open front unrounded vowel	open	front	unrounded	304	a		&#97;	a	Sound sample
Open front rounded vowel	open	front	rounded	312	ɶ		&#630;	&	Sound sample
Open back unrounded vowel	open	back	unrounded	305	ɑ		&#593;	A	Sound sample
Open back rounded vowel	open	back	rounded	313	ɒ		&#594;	Q	Sound sample

== See also ==
- List of consonants
- Index of phonetics articles

Place →	Labial					Coronal										Dorsal					Laryngeal			
Manner ↓	Bilabial		Labiodental		Linguolabial		Dental		Alveolar		Postalveolar		Retroflex		(Alveolo-)palatal		Velar		Uvular		Pharyngeal/epiglottal		Glottal	
Nasal	m̥	m	ɱ̊	ɱ		n̼	n̪̊	n̪	n̥	n	n̠̊	n̠	ɳ̊	ɳ	ɲ̊	ɲ	ŋ̊	ŋ	ɴ̥	ɴ				
Plosive	p	b	p̪	b̪	t̼	d̼	t̪	d̪	t	d			ʈ	ɖ	c	ɟ	k	ɡ	q	ɢ	ʡ		ʔ	
Sibilant affricate							t̪s̪	d̪z̪	ts	dz	t̠ʃ	d̠ʒ	tʂ	dʐ	tɕ	dʑ								
Non-sibilant affricate	pɸ	bβ	p̪f	b̪v			t̪θ	d̪ð	tɹ̝̊	dɹ̝	t̠ɹ̠̊˔	d̠ɹ̠˔			cç	ɟʝ	kx	ɡɣ	qχ	ɢʁ	ʡʜ	ʡʢ	ʔh	
Sibilant fricative							s̪	z̪	s	z	ʃ	ʒ	ʂ	ʐ	ɕ	ʑ								
Non-sibilant fricative	ɸ	β	f	v	θ̼	ð̼	θ	ð	θ̠	ð̠	ɹ̠̊˔	ɹ̠˔	ɻ̊˔	ɻ˔	ç	ʝ	x	ɣ	χ	ʁ	ħ	ʕ	h	ɦ
Approximant		β̞		ʋ				ð̞		ɹ		ɹ̠		ɻ		j		ɰ						˷
Tap/flap		ⱱ̟		ⱱ					ɾ̥	ɾ			ɽ̊	ɽ						ɢ̆		ʡ̆		
Trill	ʙ̥	ʙ							r̥	r		r̠	ɽ̊r̥	ɽr					ʀ̥	ʀ	ʜ	ʢ		
Lateral affricate									tɬ	dɮ			tꞎ	d𝼅	c𝼆	ɟʎ̝	k𝼄	ɡʟ̝						
Lateral fricative							ɬ̪		ɬ	ɮ			ꞎ	𝼅	𝼆	ʎ̝	𝼄	ʟ̝						
Lateral approximant								l̪	l̥	l		l̠	ɭ̊	ɭ	ʎ̥	ʎ	ʟ̥	ʟ		ʟ̠				
Lateral tap/flap									ɺ̥	ɺ			𝼈̊	𝼈		ʎ̆		ʟ̆						

		BL	LD	D	A	PA	RF	P	V	U
Implosive	Voiced	ɓ			ɗ		ᶑ	ʄ	ɠ	ʛ
Implosive	Voiceless	ɓ̥			ɗ̥		ᶑ̊	ʄ̊	ɠ̊	ʛ̥
Ejective	Stop	pʼ			tʼ		ʈʼ	cʼ	kʼ	qʼ
Ejective	Affricate		p̪fʼ	tθʼ	tsʼ	tʃʼ	tʂʼ	tɕʼ	kxʼ	qχʼ
Ejective	Fricative	ɸʼ	fʼ	θʼ	sʼ	ʃʼ	ʂʼ	ɕʼ	xʼ	χʼ
Ejective	Lateral affricate				tɬʼ			c𝼆ʼ	k𝼄ʼ	q𝼄ʼ
Ejective	Lateral fricative				ɬʼ					
Click (top: velar; bottom: uvular)	Tenuis	kʘ qʘ		kǀ qǀ	kǃ qǃ		k𝼊 q𝼊	kǂ qǂ		
Click (top: velar; bottom: uvular)	Voiced	ɡʘ ɢʘ		ɡǀ ɢǀ	ɡǃ ɢǃ		ɡ𝼊 ɢ𝼊	ɡǂ ɢǂ		
Click (top: velar; bottom: uvular)	Nasal	ŋʘ ɴʘ		ŋǀ ɴǀ	ŋǃ ɴǃ		ŋ𝼊 ɴ𝼊	ŋǂ ɴǂ	ʞ	
Click (top: velar; bottom: uvular)	Tenuis lateral				kǁ qǁ					
Click (top: velar; bottom: uvular)	Voiced lateral				ɡǁ ɢǁ					
Click (top: velar; bottom: uvular)	Nasal lateral				ŋǁ ɴǁ					
