= John Local =

British linguist and phonetician

John Local, BA, Ph.D. (University of Newcastle upon Tyne) (born 1947), is a British phonetician and Emeritus Professor of Phonetics at the University of York. He was one of the creators of the experimental Yorktalk non-segmental speech synthesis system (original computational implementation was by John Coleman) which employed techniques of Firthian Prosodic Analysis (FPA), an approach to phonology developed by J.R. Firth and members of the London School of linguistics. His book Doing Phonology written with John Kelly provides a radical contemporary take on FPA. Arising out of work which combined detailed phonetic analysis and Conversation Analysis (French and Local 1983) his recent research has explored the interactional functioning of phonetic detail and phonetic variation in talk-in-interaction (Local and Walker 2005). According to Ford and Couper-Kuhlen (2004), Local's work 'has been seminal in founding a phonology for conversation. ... his studies have revealed dimensions of patterned sound production in talk-in-interaction hitherto unfathomed' (2004:13).
