= Voiced palatal fricative =

Consonantal sound represented by ⟨ʝ⟩ in IPA

ʝ
- IPA number: 139

Audio sample
- source · help

Encoding
- Entity (decimal): &#669;
- Unicode (hex): U+029D
- X-SAMPA: j\
- Braille: ⠦ (braille pattern dots-236) ⠚ (braille pattern dots-245)
Image

A voiced palatal fricative is a type of consonantal sound used in some spoken languages. The symbol in the International Phonetic Alphabet (IPA) that represents this sound is ⟨ʝ⟩ (crossed-tail j). It is the non-sibilant equivalent of the voiced alveolo-palatal sibilant.

In broad transcription, the symbol for the palatal approximant, ⟨j⟩, may be used for the sake of simplicity.

A voiced palatal fricative is an uncommon sound, occurring in only 7 of the 317 languages surveyed by the original UCLA Phonological Segment Inventory Database. In Dutch, Kabyle, Margi, Modern Greek, and Scottish Gaelic, the sound occurs phonemically, along with its voiceless counterpart, and in several more, the sound occurs as a result of phonological processes.

To produce this sound, the tip of the tongue is placed against the roof of the mouth behind the upper front teeth; then, while exhaling, the space between the tongue and the palate is narrowed, creating a friction-like sound similar to the ⟨s⟩ sound (IPA: [ʒ]) in the English word measure.

== Features ==
Features of a voiced palatal fricative:

- Its manner of articulation is fricative, which means it is produced by constricting air flow through a narrow channel at the place of articulation, causing turbulence.
- Its place of articulation is palatal, which means it is articulated with the middle or back part of the tongue raised to the hard palate.
- Its phonation is voiced, which means the vocal cords vibrate during the articulation.
- It is an oral consonant, which means that air is not allowed to escape through the nose.
- It is a median consonant, which means it is produced by directing the airstream down the midline of the tongue, rather than to the sides.
- Its airstream mechanism is pulmonic, which means it is articulated by pushing air only with the intercostal muscles and abdominal muscles, as in most speech sounds.

== Occurrence ==
=== Palatal ===
Language		Word	IPA	Meaning	Notes
Asturian		frayar	[fɾäˈʝär]	'to destroy'	
Burmese					Allophone of /j/, particularly word initially.
Catalan	Mallorcan	figuera	[fiˈʝeɾə]	'fig tree'	Occurs in complementary distribution with [ɟ]. Corresponds to [ɣ] in other varieties. See Catalan phonology
Danish	Standard	talg	[ˈtʰælˀʝ]	'tallow'	Possible word-final allophone of /j/ when it occurs after /l/. See Danish phonology
Dutch	Standard	ja	[ʝaː]	'yes'	Frequent allophone of /j/, especially in emphatic speech. See Dutch phonology
German	Standard	Jacke	[ˈʝäkə]	'jacket'	Most often transcribed in IPA with ⟨j⟩; also described as an approximant [j] and a sound variable between a fricative and an approximant. See Standard German phonology
Greek	Standard	γεια	[ʝɐ]	'hi'	
Greek	Cypriot	ελιά	[e̞ˈʝːɐ]	'olive'	Allophone of /ʎ/
Hungarian		dobj be	[dobʝ bɛ]	'throw in'	An allophone of /j/. See Hungarian phonology
Irish		an ghrian	[ənʲ ˈʝɾʲiən̪ˠ]	'the sun'	See Irish phonology
Italian	Southern dialects	figlio	[ˈfiʝːo]	'son'	Corresponds to /ʎ/ in standard Italian. See Italian phonology
Kabyle		cceǥ	[ʃʃəʝ]	'to slip'	
Korean		사향노루 / sahyangnoru	[sɐʝɐŋnoɾu]	'Siberian musk deer'	The sound is sometimes heard by people when /h/ is between voiced and combined with /i/, /t/ and /j/, See Korean phonology
Lithuanian		ji	[ʝɪ]	'she'	Most often transcribed in IPA with ⟨j⟩; also described as an approximant [j]. See Lithuanian phonology
Margi					Contrasts /ɟ, ᶮɟ, ç, ʝ, j, j̰, ɣ/.
Mapudungun		kayu	[kɜˈʝʊ]	'six'	This phoneme corresponds to the letter Y in Mapudungün. See Mapuche language
Norwegian	Urban East	gi	[ʝiː]	'to give'	Allophone of /j/, especially before and after close vowels and in energetic speech. See Norwegian phonology
Pashto	Ghilji dialect	موږ	[muʝ]	'we'	
Pashto	Wardak dialect	موږ	[muʝ]	'we'	
Ripuarian		zeije	[ˈt͡sɛʝə]	'to show'	
Russian		я́ма	[ˈʝämə]	'pit'	Allophone of /j/ in emphatic speech. See Russian phonology
Scottish Gaelic		dhiubh	[ʝu]	'of them'	Weak fricative; merges with [j] in some dialects. See Scottish Gaelic phonology
Spanish		sayo	[ˈsäʝo̞]	'smock'	May also be represented by ⟨ll⟩ in many dialects. See Spanish phonology and Yeísmo
Swedish		jord	[ʝɯᵝːɖ]	'soil'	Allophone of /j/. See Swedish phonology
Vietnamese	Middle Vietnamese	Gió [𩙋]	[ʝɔ^{B1}] (Tonkinese dialect)	'wind'	See Middle Vietnamese phonology

=== Post-palatal ===
Voiced post-palatal or pre-velar fricative

ʝ᫢

ɣ᫈

Audio sample
- source · help

There is also a voiced post-palatal or pre-velar fricative in some languages, which is articulated slightly more back compared with the place of articulation of the prototypical voiced palatal fricative but not as back as the prototypical voiced velar fricative. The International Phonetic Alphabet does not have a separate symbol for that sound, but it can be transcribed as ⟨ʝ̠⟩, ⟨ʝ᫢⟩ (a retracted ⟨ʝ⟩), ⟨ɣ̟⟩, ⟨ɣ᫈⟩ (an advanced ⟨ɣ⟩) or ⟨ɣʲ⟩ (palatalized ⟨ɣ⟩, though this is more ambiguous than the others; see below).

Language		Word	IPA	Meaning	Notes
Belarusian		геагра́фія	[ɣ̟e.äˈɣɾäfʲijä]	'geography'	Typically transcribed in IPA with ⟨ɣʲ⟩. See Belarusian phonology
Dutch	Standard Belgian	negen	[ˈneː.ʝ̠̊ø̜]	'nine'	Often (partially) devoiced. May be velar [ɣ] instead, even near non-front vowels. See Dutch phonology
Dutch	Southern accents	negen	[ˈneː.ʝ̠̊ø̜]	'nine'	Often (partially) devoiced. May be velar [ɣ] instead, even near non-front vowels. See Dutch phonology
German	Standard	Riese	[ˈɣ̟iːzə]	'giant'	Allophone of the fricative /ʁ/ before and after front vowels. See Standard German phonology
Greek	Standard Modern	γένος	[ˈʝ̠e̞no̞s̠]	'grammatical gender'	See Modern Greek phonology
Limburgish	Weert dialect	gèr	[ɣ̟ɛ̈ːʀ̝̊]	'gladly'	Allophone of /ɣ/ before and after front vowels. See Weert dialect phonology
Lithuanian		Hiustonas	[ˈɣ̟ʊs̪t̪ɔn̪ɐs̪]	'Houston'	Very rare; typically transcribed in IPA with ⟨ɣʲ⟩. See Lithuanian phonology
Russian	Standard	други́х ги́мнов	[d̪rʊˈɡ̟ʲɪɣ̟ ˈɡ̟ʲimn̪əf]	'of other anthems'	Allophone of /x/ before voiced soft consonants; typically transcribed in IPA with ⟨ɣʲ⟩. The example also illustrates [ɡ̟]. See Russian phonology
Russian	Southern	гимн	[ɣ̟ʲimn̪]	'anthem'	Typically transcribed in IPA with ⟨ɣʲ⟩; corresponds to [ɡʲ] in standard Russian. See Russian phonology
Scottish Gaelic		seadh	[ʃɤɣ̟]	'yes, indeed'	Allophone of /ɣ/ after /ɤ/

=== Variable ===
Language	Word	IPA	Meaning	Notes
Mapudungun				Allophone of /ɣ/ before the front vowels /ɪ, e/.

== See also ==
- Index of phonetics articles

== Notes ==
Place →	Labial					Coronal										Dorsal					Laryngeal			
Manner ↓	Bilabial		Labiodental		Linguolabial		Dental		Alveolar		Postalveolar		Retroflex		(Alveolo-)palatal		Velar		Uvular		Pharyngeal/epiglottal		Glottal	
Nasal	m̥	m	ɱ̊	ɱ		n̼	n̪̊	n̪	n̥	n	n̠̊	n̠	ɳ̊	ɳ	ɲ̊	ɲ	ŋ̊	ŋ	ɴ̥	ɴ				
Plosive	p	b	p̪	b̪	t̼	d̼	t̪	d̪	t	d			ʈ	ɖ	c	ɟ	k	ɡ	q	ɢ	ʡ		ʔ	
Sibilant affricate							t̪s̪	d̪z̪	ts	dz	t̠ʃ	d̠ʒ	tʂ	dʐ	tɕ	dʑ								
Non-sibilant affricate	pɸ	bβ	p̪f	b̪v			t̪θ	d̪ð	tɹ̝̊	dɹ̝	t̠ɹ̠̊˔	d̠ɹ̠˔			cç	ɟʝ	kx	ɡɣ	qχ	ɢʁ	ʡʜ	ʡʢ	ʔh	
Sibilant fricative							s̪	z̪	s	z	ʃ	ʒ	ʂ	ʐ	ɕ	ʑ								
Non-sibilant fricative	ɸ	β	f	v	θ̼	ð̼	θ	ð	θ̠	ð̠	ɹ̠̊˔	ɹ̠˔	ɻ̊˔	ɻ˔	ç	ʝ	x	ɣ	χ	ʁ	ħ	ʕ	h	ɦ
Approximant		β̞		ʋ				ð̞		ɹ		ɹ̠		ɻ		j		ɰ						˷
Tap/flap		ⱱ̟		ⱱ					ɾ̥	ɾ			ɽ̊	ɽ						ɢ̆		ʡ̆		
Trill	ʙ̥	ʙ							r̥	r		r̠	ɽ̊r̥	ɽr					ʀ̥	ʀ	ʜ	ʢ		
Lateral affricate									tɬ	dɮ			tꞎ	d𝼅	c𝼆	ɟʎ̝	k𝼄	ɡʟ̝						
Lateral fricative							ɬ̪		ɬ	ɮ			ꞎ	𝼅	𝼆	ʎ̝	𝼄	ʟ̝						
Lateral approximant								l̪	l̥	l		l̠	ɭ̊	ɭ	ʎ̥	ʎ	ʟ̥	ʟ		ʟ̠				
Lateral tap/flap									ɺ̥	ɺ			𝼈̊	𝼈		ʎ̆		ʟ̆						

		BL	LD	D	A	PA	RF	P	V	U
Implosive	Voiced	ɓ			ɗ		ᶑ	ʄ	ɠ	ʛ
Implosive	Voiceless	ɓ̥			ɗ̥		ᶑ̊	ʄ̊	ɠ̊	ʛ̥
Ejective	Stop	pʼ			tʼ		ʈʼ	cʼ	kʼ	qʼ
Ejective	Affricate		p̪fʼ	tθʼ	tsʼ	tʃʼ	tʂʼ	tɕʼ	kxʼ	qχʼ
Ejective	Fricative	ɸʼ	fʼ	θʼ	sʼ	ʃʼ	ʂʼ	ɕʼ	xʼ	χʼ
Ejective	Lateral affricate				tɬʼ			c𝼆ʼ	k𝼄ʼ	q𝼄ʼ
Ejective	Lateral fricative				ɬʼ					
Click (top: velar; bottom: uvular)	Tenuis	kʘ qʘ		kǀ qǀ	kǃ qǃ		k𝼊 q𝼊	kǂ qǂ		
Click (top: velar; bottom: uvular)	Voiced	ɡʘ ɢʘ		ɡǀ ɢǀ	ɡǃ ɢǃ		ɡ𝼊 ɢ𝼊	ɡǂ ɢǂ		
Click (top: velar; bottom: uvular)	Nasal	ŋʘ ɴʘ		ŋǀ ɴǀ	ŋǃ ɴǃ		ŋ𝼊 ɴ𝼊	ŋǂ ɴǂ	ʞ	
Click (top: velar; bottom: uvular)	Tenuis lateral				kǁ qǁ					
Click (top: velar; bottom: uvular)	Voiced lateral				ɡǁ ɢǁ					
Click (top: velar; bottom: uvular)	Nasal lateral				ŋǁ ɴǁ					
