= Voiceless dental non-sibilant affricate =

Consonantal sound

tθ

t̪θ

𝼤

Audio sample
- source · help
Image

A voiceless dental non-sibilant affricate is a type of consonantal sound used in some spoken languages. The symbols in the International Phonetic Alphabet that represent this sound are ⟨t͡θ⟩, ⟨t͜θ⟩, ⟨t̪͡θ⟩, and ⟨t̟͡θ⟩.

== Features ==
Features of a voiceless dental non-sibilant affricate:

- Its manner of articulation is affricate, which means it is produced by first stopping the airflow entirely, then allowing air flow through a constricted channel at the place of articulation, causing turbulence.
- Its place of articulation is dental, which means it is articulated with either the tip or the blade of the tongue at the upper teeth, termed respectively apical and laminal. Note that most stops and liquids described as dental are actually denti-alveolar.
- Its phonation is voiceless, which means it is produced without vibrations of the vocal cords. In some languages the vocal cords are actively separated, so it is always voiceless; in others the cords are lax, so that it may take on the voicing of adjacent sounds.
- It is an oral consonant, which means that air is not allowed to escape through the nose.
- It is a median consonant, which means it is produced by directing the airstream down the midline of the tongue, rather than to the sides.
- Its airstream mechanism is pulmonic, which means it is articulated by pushing air only with the intercostal muscles and abdominal muscles, as in most speech sounds.

== Occurrence ==
Language		Word	IPA	Meaning	Notes
Burmese		သုံး / thon:	[t̪θóʊ̯̃]	'three'	Common realization of /θ/.
Chinese	Jiaoliao Mandarin, Yinan	攥 / zuàn	[t̪θɑ̃˥]	'grip'	Corresponds to /ts/ in other varieties.
Chipewyan		ddhéth	[t̪θɛ́θ]	'hide'	Contrasts unaspirated, aspirated and ejective affricates.
English	Dublin	think	[t̪θɪŋk]	'think'	Corresponds to [θ] in other dialects; may be [t̪] instead.
English	Maori	think	[t̪θɪŋk]	'think'	Possible realization of /θ/. See New Zealand English phonology
English	New York City	think	[t̪θɪŋk]	'think'	Corresponds to [θ] in other dialects, may be a stop [t̪] or a fricative [θ] instead.
English	Cajun	think	[t̪θɪŋk]	'think'	Corresponds to [θ] in other dialects, may be a stop [t̪] or a fricative [θ] instead.
English	Received Pronunciation	eighth	[eɪt̪θ]	'eighth'	In a limited set of word-final environments.
Greek		γοτθικός	[ɣo̞t̪θiˈko̞s]	'gothic'	Represented by ⟨τθ⟩, appears in some specific words.
Slave	Slave proper	eníddhę	[ɛ̀nít̪θɛ̃̀]	'we want'	Corresponds to /p/ or /kʷ/ in other varieties of Slave.

== See also ==
- Index of phonetics articles

== Notes ==
Place →	Labial					Coronal										Dorsal					Laryngeal			
Manner ↓	Bilabial		Labiodental		Linguolabial		Dental		Alveolar		Postalveolar		Retroflex		(Alveolo-)palatal		Velar		Uvular		Pharyngeal/epiglottal		Glottal	
Nasal	m̥	m	ɱ̊	ɱ		n̼	n̪̊	n̪	n̥	n	n̠̊	n̠	ɳ̊	ɳ	ɲ̊	ɲ	ŋ̊	ŋ	ɴ̥	ɴ				
Plosive	p	b	p̪	b̪	t̼	d̼	t̪	d̪	t	d			ʈ	ɖ	c	ɟ	k	ɡ	q	ɢ	ʡ		ʔ	
Sibilant affricate							t̪s̪	d̪z̪	ts	dz	t̠ʃ	d̠ʒ	tʂ	dʐ	tɕ	dʑ								
Non-sibilant affricate	pɸ	bβ	p̪f	b̪v			t̪θ	d̪ð	tɹ̝̊	dɹ̝	t̠ɹ̠̊˔	d̠ɹ̠˔			cç	ɟʝ	kx	ɡɣ	qχ	ɢʁ	ʡʜ	ʡʢ	ʔh	
Sibilant fricative							s̪	z̪	s	z	ʃ	ʒ	ʂ	ʐ	ɕ	ʑ								
Non-sibilant fricative	ɸ	β	f	v	θ̼	ð̼	θ	ð	θ̠	ð̠	ɹ̠̊˔	ɹ̠˔	ɻ̊˔	ɻ˔	ç	ʝ	x	ɣ	χ	ʁ	ħ	ʕ	h	ɦ
Approximant		β̞		ʋ				ð̞		ɹ		ɹ̠		ɻ		j		ɰ						˷
Tap/flap		ⱱ̟		ⱱ					ɾ̥	ɾ			ɽ̊	ɽ						ɢ̆		ʡ̆		
Trill	ʙ̥	ʙ							r̥	r		r̠	ɽ̊r̥	ɽr					ʀ̥	ʀ	ʜ	ʢ		
Lateral affricate									tɬ	dɮ			tꞎ	d𝼅	c𝼆	ɟʎ̝	k𝼄	ɡʟ̝						
Lateral fricative							ɬ̪		ɬ	ɮ			ꞎ	𝼅	𝼆	ʎ̝	𝼄	ʟ̝						
Lateral approximant								l̪	l̥	l		l̠	ɭ̊	ɭ	ʎ̥	ʎ	ʟ̥	ʟ		ʟ̠				
Lateral tap/flap									ɺ̥	ɺ			𝼈̊	𝼈		ʎ̆		ʟ̆						

		BL	LD	D	A	PA	RF	P	V	U
Implosive	Voiced	ɓ			ɗ		ᶑ	ʄ	ɠ	ʛ
Implosive	Voiceless	ɓ̥			ɗ̥		ᶑ̊	ʄ̊	ɠ̊	ʛ̥
Ejective	Stop	pʼ			tʼ		ʈʼ	cʼ	kʼ	qʼ
Ejective	Affricate		p̪fʼ	tθʼ	tsʼ	tʃʼ	tʂʼ	tɕʼ	kxʼ	qχʼ
Ejective	Fricative	ɸʼ	fʼ	θʼ	sʼ	ʃʼ	ʂʼ	ɕʼ	xʼ	χʼ
Ejective	Lateral affricate				tɬʼ			c𝼆ʼ	k𝼄ʼ	q𝼄ʼ
Ejective	Lateral fricative				ɬʼ					
Click (top: velar; bottom: uvular)	Tenuis	kʘ qʘ		kǀ qǀ	kǃ qǃ		k𝼊 q𝼊	kǂ qǂ		
Click (top: velar; bottom: uvular)	Voiced	ɡʘ ɢʘ		ɡǀ ɢǀ	ɡǃ ɢǃ		ɡ𝼊 ɢ𝼊	ɡǂ ɢǂ		
Click (top: velar; bottom: uvular)	Nasal	ŋʘ ɴʘ		ŋǀ ɴǀ	ŋǃ ɴǃ		ŋ𝼊 ɴ𝼊	ŋǂ ɴǂ	ʞ	
Click (top: velar; bottom: uvular)	Tenuis lateral				kǁ qǁ					
Click (top: velar; bottom: uvular)	Voiced lateral				ɡǁ ɢǁ					
Click (top: velar; bottom: uvular)	Nasal lateral				ŋǁ ɴǁ					
