= Voiceless labiodental nasal =

Consonantal sound represented by ⟨ɱ̊⟩ in IPA

ɱ̊

m̪̊

Audio sample
- source · help

Encoding
- X-SAMPA: F_0

A voiceless labiodental nasal is a type of consonantal sound, used in some spoken languages. The symbol in the International Phonetic Alphabet that represents this sound is ⟨ɱ̊⟩, a combination of the letter for the voiced labiodental nasal and a diacritic indicating voicelessness; in certain sources, the diacritic can be found below ⟨ɱ̥⟩.

== Features ==
Features of a voiceless labiodental nasal:

- Its manner of articulation is occlusive, which means it is produced by obstructing airflow in the vocal tract. Because the consonant is also nasal, the blocked airflow is redirected through the nose.
- Its place of articulation is labiodental, which means it is articulated with the lower lip and the upper teeth.
- Its phonation is voiceless, which means it is produced without vibrations of the vocal cords.
- It is a nasal consonant, which means air is exclusively allowed to escape through the nose for nasal stops; otherwise, in addition to through the mouth.
- Because the sound is not produced with airflow over the tongue, the median–lateral dichotomy does not apply.
- Its airstream mechanism is pulmonic, which means it is articulated by pushing air only with the intercostal muscles and abdominal muscles, as in most speech sounds.

== Occurrence ==
Language	Word	IPA	Meaning	Notes
Angami	pemhewaché	[fəɱ̊ʰəwat͡ʃe]	'extinguish'	Allophone of /m̥ʰ/ before /ə/.
Kinyamwezi	mfulá	[ɱ̊fulá]	'good'	Allophone of class-9/10 nasal prefix /N/ before /f/.

== See also ==
- Index of phonetics articles
- Voiced bilabial nasal

== Notes ==
Place →	Labial					Coronal										Dorsal					Laryngeal			
Manner ↓	Bilabial		Labiodental		Linguolabial		Dental		Alveolar		Postalveolar		Retroflex		(Alveolo-)palatal		Velar		Uvular		Pharyngeal/epiglottal		Glottal	
Nasal	m̥	m	ɱ̊	ɱ		n̼	n̪̊	n̪	n̥	n	n̠̊	n̠	ɳ̊	ɳ	ɲ̊	ɲ	ŋ̊	ŋ	ɴ̥	ɴ				
Plosive	p	b	p̪	b̪	t̼	d̼	t̪	d̪	t	d			ʈ	ɖ	c	ɟ	k	ɡ	q	ɢ	ʡ		ʔ	
Sibilant affricate							t̪s̪	d̪z̪	ts	dz	t̠ʃ	d̠ʒ	tʂ	dʐ	tɕ	dʑ								
Non-sibilant affricate	pɸ	bβ	p̪f	b̪v			t̪θ	d̪ð	tɹ̝̊	dɹ̝	t̠ɹ̠̊˔	d̠ɹ̠˔			cç	ɟʝ	kx	ɡɣ	qχ	ɢʁ	ʡʜ	ʡʢ	ʔh	
Sibilant fricative							s̪	z̪	s	z	ʃ	ʒ	ʂ	ʐ	ɕ	ʑ								
Non-sibilant fricative	ɸ	β	f	v	θ̼	ð̼	θ	ð	θ̠	ð̠	ɹ̠̊˔	ɹ̠˔	ɻ̊˔	ɻ˔	ç	ʝ	x	ɣ	χ	ʁ	ħ	ʕ	h	ɦ
Approximant		β̞		ʋ				ð̞		ɹ		ɹ̠		ɻ		j		ɰ						˷
Tap/flap		ⱱ̟		ⱱ					ɾ̥	ɾ			ɽ̊	ɽ						ɢ̆		ʡ̆		
Trill	ʙ̥	ʙ							r̥	r		r̠	ɽ̊r̥	ɽr					ʀ̥	ʀ	ʜ	ʢ		
Lateral affricate									tɬ	dɮ			tꞎ	d𝼅	c𝼆	ɟʎ̝	k𝼄	ɡʟ̝						
Lateral fricative							ɬ̪		ɬ	ɮ			ꞎ	𝼅	𝼆	ʎ̝	𝼄	ʟ̝						
Lateral approximant								l̪	l̥	l		l̠	ɭ̊	ɭ	ʎ̥	ʎ	ʟ̥	ʟ		ʟ̠				
Lateral tap/flap									ɺ̥	ɺ			𝼈̊	𝼈		ʎ̆		ʟ̆						

		BL	LD	D	A	PA	RF	P	V	U
Implosive	Voiced	ɓ			ɗ		ᶑ	ʄ	ɠ	ʛ
Implosive	Voiceless	ɓ̥			ɗ̥		ᶑ̊	ʄ̊	ɠ̊	ʛ̥
Ejective	Stop	pʼ			tʼ		ʈʼ	cʼ	kʼ	qʼ
Ejective	Affricate		p̪fʼ	tθʼ	tsʼ	tʃʼ	tʂʼ	tɕʼ	kxʼ	qχʼ
Ejective	Fricative	ɸʼ	fʼ	θʼ	sʼ	ʃʼ	ʂʼ	ɕʼ	xʼ	χʼ
Ejective	Lateral affricate				tɬʼ			c𝼆ʼ	k𝼄ʼ	q𝼄ʼ
Ejective	Lateral fricative				ɬʼ					
Click (top: velar; bottom: uvular)	Tenuis	kʘ qʘ		kǀ qǀ	kǃ qǃ		k𝼊 q𝼊	kǂ qǂ		
Click (top: velar; bottom: uvular)	Voiced	ɡʘ ɢʘ		ɡǀ ɢǀ	ɡǃ ɢǃ		ɡ𝼊 ɢ𝼊	ɡǂ ɢǂ		
Click (top: velar; bottom: uvular)	Nasal	ŋʘ ɴʘ		ŋǀ ɴǀ	ŋǃ ɴǃ		ŋ𝼊 ɴ𝼊	ŋǂ ɴǂ	ʞ	
Click (top: velar; bottom: uvular)	Tenuis lateral				kǁ qǁ					
Click (top: velar; bottom: uvular)	Voiced lateral				ɡǁ ɢǁ					
Click (top: velar; bottom: uvular)	Nasal lateral				ŋǁ ɴǁ					
