= Voiced uvular plosive =

Consonantal sound represented by ⟨ɢ⟩ in IPA

ɢ
- IPA number: 112

Audio sample
- source · help

Encoding
- Entity (decimal): &#610;
- Unicode (hex): U+0262
- X-SAMPA: G\
- Braille: ⠔ (braille pattern dots-35) ⠛ (braille pattern dots-1245)
Image

A voiced uvular plosive or stop is a type of consonantal sound, used in some spoken languages. It is pronounced like a voiced velar plosive [ɡ], except that the tongue makes contact not on the soft palate but on the uvula. The symbol in the International Phonetic Alphabet that represents this sound is ⟨ɢ⟩, a small capital version of the Latin letter g.

[ɢ] is a rare sound, even compared to other uvulars. Vaux proposes a phonological explanation: uvular consonants normally involve a neutral or a retracted tongue root, whereas voiced stops often involve an advanced tongue root: two articulations that cannot physically co-occur. This leads many languages of the world to have a voiced uvular fricative [ʁ] instead as the voiced counterpart of the voiceless uvular plosive. Examples are Inuit; several Turkic languages such as Uyghur; several Northwest Caucasian languages such as Abkhaz; as well as several Northeast Caucasian languages such as Ingush.

== Features ==
Sagittal section of a voiced uvular plosive

Features of a voiced uvular stop:

- Its manner of articulation is occlusive, which means it is produced by obstructing airflow in the vocal tract. Since the consonant is also oral, with no nasal outlet, it is a plosive.
- Its place of articulation is uvular, which means it is articulated with the back of the tongue (the dorsum) at the uvula.
- Its phonation is voiced, which means the vocal cords vibrate during the articulation.
- It is an oral consonant, which means that air is not allowed to escape through the nose.
- It is a median consonant, which means it is produced by directing the airstream down the midline of the tongue, rather than to the sides.
- Its airstream mechanism is pulmonic, which means it is articulated by pushing air only with the intercostal muscles and abdominal muscles, as in most speech sounds.

== Occurrence ==
=== Uvular ===
| Language | | Word | IPA | Meaning | Notes |
|---|---|---|---|---|---|
| Arabic | Sudanese | بقرة | [bɑɢɑrɑ] | 'cow' | Corresponds to /q/ in Standard Arabic. See Arabic phonology |
| Arabic | Yemeni | قات | [ɢɑːt] | 'Khat' | Some dialects. Corresponds to /q/ in Standard Arabic. See Arabic phonology |
| Bugan | Manlong dialect | | [ɴɢei˧˩] | 'tilted, sloping, inclined' | Has both plain and prenasalized variants. See Manlong Bugan phonology |
| Low German | Rügen dialect | lang | [la̱ɴɢ̥] | 'long' | |
| Ket | | báŋquk | [baŋ˩˧ɢuk˧˩] | 'cave in the ground' | Allophone of /q/ after /ŋ/. |
| Kwak'wala | | ǥilakas'la | [ɢilakasʔla] | 'thank you' | |
| Lishan Didan | Urmi Dialect | בקא/baqqa | [baɢːɑ] | 'frog' | Allophone of /q/ when between a vowel/sonorant and a vowel. |
| Malto | | तेंग़े | [t̪eɴɢe] | 'to tell' | Allophone of /ʁ/ after /ŋ/, /ʁ, ŋʁ/ is /h/ in Southern and Western dialects. See Malto language#Phonology. |
| Mongolian | | Монгол ᠮᠣᠩᠭᠣᠯ | [mɔɴɢɔ̆ɮ] | 'Mongolian' | Allophone of /g/ before back vowels, phonemic word-finally. |
| Nivkh | | ньыӈ ӷан | [ɲɤŋ ɢæn] | 'our dog' | Allophone of /q/ |
| Persian | Iranian | قهوه | [ɢæhˈve] | 'coffee' | See Persian phonology. |
| Somali | | Muqdisho | [muɢdiʃɔ] | 'Mogadishu' | Allophone of /q/. See Somali phonology |
| Tabasaran | | дугу | [d̪uɢu] | 'he' (ergative) | |
| Tsakhur | | къгяйэ | [ɢajɛ] | 'stone' | |
| Turkmen | | gar | [ɢɑɾ] | 'snow' | An allophone of /ɡ/ next to back vowels |
| Xumi | Lower | [ɢʶo˩˥] | | 'to stew' | Slightly affricated; occurs only in a few words. Corresponds to the cluster /Nɡ/ in Upper Xumi. |

=== Pre-uvular ===
Voiced post-velar or pre-uvular plosive

ɢ̟

ɡ᫢

Audio sample
- source · help

There is also a voiced post-velar or pre-uvular plosive in some languages, which is articulated slightly more front compared with the place of articulation of the prototypical uvular plosive, though not as front as the prototypical velar plosive. The International Phonetic Alphabet does not have a separate symbol for that sound, though it can be transcribed as ⟨ɢ̟⟩, (symbol denotes an advanced ⟨ɢ⟩), ⟨ɡ̠⟩ or ⟨ɡ᫢⟩ (both symbols denote a retracted ⟨ɡ⟩).

| Language | | Word | IPA | Meaning | Notes |
|---|---|---|---|---|---|
| English | Australian | gaudy | [ˈɡ̠oːɾi] | 'gaudy' | Pre-uvular; allophone of /ɡ/ before /ʊ oː ɔ oɪ ʊə/. See Australian English phonology |
| Yanyuwa | | kuykurlu | [ɡ̠uɡ̟uɭu] | 'sacred' | Pre-uvular. Contrasts plain and prenasalized versions |

== See also ==
- Index of phonetics articles

== Notes ==
| Place → | Labial | | | | | Coronal | | | | | | | | | | Dorsal | | | | | Laryngeal | | | |
| Manner ↓ | Bilabial | | Labiodental | | Linguolabial | | Dental | | Alveolar | | Postalveolar | | Retroflex | | (Alveolo-)palatal | | Velar | | Uvular | | Pharyngeal/epiglottal | | Glottal | |
|---|---|---|---|---|---|---|---|---|---|---|---|---|---|---|---|---|---|---|---|---|---|---|---|---|
| Nasal | m̥ | m | ɱ̊ | ɱ | | n̼ | n̪̊ | n̪ | n̥ | n | n̠̊ | n̠ | ɳ̊ | ɳ | ɲ̊ | ɲ | ŋ̊ | ŋ | ɴ̥ | ɴ | | | | |
| Plosive | p | b | p̪ | b̪ | t̼ | d̼ | t̪ | d̪ | t | d | | | ʈ | ɖ | c | ɟ | k | ɡ | q | ɢ | ʡ | | ʔ | |
| Sibilant affricate | | | | | | | t̪s̪ | d̪z̪ | ts | dz | t̠ʃ | d̠ʒ | tʂ | dʐ | tɕ | dʑ | | | | | | | | |
| Non-sibilant affricate | pɸ | bβ | p̪f | b̪v | | | t̪θ | d̪ð | tɹ̝̊ | dɹ̝ | t̠ɹ̠̊˔ | d̠ɹ̠˔ | | | cç | ɟʝ | kx | ɡɣ | qχ | ɢʁ | ʡʜ | ʡʢ | ʔh | |
| Sibilant fricative | | | | | | | s̪ | z̪ | s | z | ʃ | ʒ | ʂ | ʐ | ɕ | ʑ | | | | | | | | |
| Non-sibilant fricative | ɸ | β | f | v | θ̼ | ð̼ | θ | ð | θ̠ | ð̠ | ɹ̠̊˔ | ɹ̠˔ | ɻ̊˔ | ɻ˔ | ç | ʝ | x | ɣ | χ | ʁ | ħ | ʕ | h | ɦ |
| Approximant | | β̞ | | ʋ | | | | ð̞ | | ɹ | | ɹ̠ | | ɻ | | j | | ɰ | | | | | | ˷ |
| Tap/flap | | ⱱ̟ | | ⱱ | | | | | ɾ̥ | ɾ | | | ɽ̊ | ɽ | | | | | | ɢ̆ | | ʡ̆ | | |
| Trill | ʙ̥ | ʙ | | | | | | | r̥ | r | | r̠ | ɽ̊r̥ | ɽr | | | | | ʀ̥ | ʀ | ʜ | ʢ | | |
| Lateral affricate | | | | | | | | | tɬ | dɮ | | | tꞎ | d𝼅 | c𝼆 | ɟʎ̝ | k𝼄 | ɡʟ̝ | | | | | | |
| Lateral fricative | | | | | | | ɬ̪ | | ɬ | ɮ | | | ꞎ | 𝼅 | 𝼆 | ʎ̝ | 𝼄 | ʟ̝ | | | | | | |
| Lateral approximant | | | | | | | | l̪ | l̥ | l | | l̠ | ɭ̊ | ɭ | ʎ̥ | ʎ | ʟ̥ | ʟ | | ʟ̠ | | | | |
| Lateral tap/flap | | | | | | | | | ɺ̥ | ɺ | | | 𝼈̊ | 𝼈 | | ʎ̆ | | ʟ̆ | | | | | | |

| | | BL | LD | D | A | PA | RF | P | V | U |
|---|---|---|---|---|---|---|---|---|---|---|
| Implosive | Voiced | ɓ | | | ɗ | | ᶑ | ʄ | ɠ | ʛ |
| Implosive | Voiceless | ɓ̥ | | | ɗ̥ | | ᶑ̊ | ʄ̊ | ɠ̊ | ʛ̥ |
| Ejective | Stop | pʼ | | | tʼ | | ʈʼ | cʼ | kʼ | qʼ |
| Ejective | Affricate | | p̪fʼ | tθʼ | tsʼ | tʃʼ | tʂʼ | tɕʼ | kxʼ | qχʼ |
| Ejective | Fricative | ɸʼ | fʼ | θʼ | sʼ | ʃʼ | ʂʼ | ɕʼ | xʼ | χʼ |
| Ejective | Lateral affricate | | | | tɬʼ | | | c𝼆ʼ | k𝼄ʼ | q𝼄ʼ |
| Ejective | Lateral fricative | | | | ɬʼ | | | | | |
| Click (top: velar; bottom: uvular) | Tenuis | kʘ qʘ | | kǀ qǀ | kǃ qǃ | | k𝼊 q𝼊 | kǂ qǂ | | |
| Click (top: velar; bottom: uvular) | Voiced | ɡʘ ɢʘ | | ɡǀ ɢǀ | ɡǃ ɢǃ | | ɡ𝼊 ɢ𝼊 | ɡǂ ɢǂ | | |
| Click (top: velar; bottom: uvular) | Nasal | ŋʘ ɴʘ | | ŋǀ ɴǀ | ŋǃ ɴǃ | | ŋ𝼊 ɴ𝼊 | ŋǂ ɴǂ | ʞ | |
| Click (top: velar; bottom: uvular) | Tenuis lateral | | | | kǁ qǁ | | | | | |
| Click (top: velar; bottom: uvular) | Voiced lateral | | | | ɡǁ ɢǁ | | | | | |
| Click (top: velar; bottom: uvular) | Nasal lateral | | | | ŋǁ ɴǁ | | | | | |
