= Sandawe language =

Language isolate of central Tanzania

Sandawe
- Sàndàwé kì’ìng
- Pronunciation: [sàndàwékìʔìŋ]
- Native to: Tanzania
- Region: Rift Valley
- Ethnicity: Sandawe
- Native speakers: 60,000 (2013)
- Language family: Language isolate, possibly related to the Khoe–Kwadi languages

Language codes
- ISO 639-2: sad
- ISO 639-3: sad
- Glottolog: sand1273
- ELP: Sandawe
- Distribution of the Sandawe language (grey) in Tanzania

Sandawe is a language spoken by about 60,000 Sandawe people in the Dodoma Region of Tanzania. Sandawe's use of click consonants, a rare feature shared with only two other languages of East Africa, Hadza and Dahalo, had been the basis of its classification as a member of the defunct Khoisan family of Southern Africa since Albert Drexel in the 1920s. It has been suggested, however, that Sandawe may be related to the Khoe family, regardless of the validity of Khoisan as a whole (Güldemann 2010). A discussion of the linguistic classification of Sandawe can be found in Sands (1998).

Language use is vigorous among both adults and children, with people in some areas monolingual. Sandawe has two dialects, northwest and southeast. Differences include speaking speed, vowel dropping, some word taboo, and minor lexical and grammatical differences. Some Alagwa and Kw'adza have shifted to Sandawe, and form now specific clans among them.

Otto Dempwolff published a grammar of Sandawe in 1916 based on fieldwork in 1909-1910. SIL International began work on Sandawe in 1996 and to date (2004), Daniel and Elisabeth Hunziker and Helen Eaton continue to work on the analysis of the language. They have so far produced a phonological description, a dialect survey report and several papers on aspects of grammar. Sandawe is also currently (since 2002) studied by Sander Steeman of Leiden University.

== Phonology ==
=== Vowels ===
Sandawe vowel chart, from Eaton (2006:237)

Sandawe has five vowel qualities:

	Front	Back
Close	i	u
Mid	e	o
Open	a	

All five vowel qualities may be found as short oral, long oral and long nasal vowels. Thus /a/ can be found as /a/, /aː/ and /ãː/ respectively. There are therefore fifteen basic vowel phonemes. Short nasal vowels also occur, apparently from the historical elision of a nasal consonant that is still attested in related forms. Long vowels are written double, aa, and long nasal vowels with a tilde, ã.

Long vowels are about 50% longer than short vowels. In morpheme-final position, low-tone /u/ and /i/ are frequently devoiced, though this may not occur after /j/, /w/, or /h/.

=== Consonants ===
==== Non-click consonants ====
The glyphs in ⟨brackets⟩ are the practical orthography developed by Hunziker and Hunziker, along with approximate equivalents in the IPA.

		Labial	Coronal		Palatal	Velar	Glottal
		Labial	Plain	Sibilant	Palatal	Velar	Glottal
Nasal		m ⟨m⟩	n ⟨n⟩				
Plosive and Affricate	Voiced	b ⟨b⟩	d ⟨d⟩	dʒ ~ dz ⟨dz⟩	ɟ͜ʎ̝ ⟨dl⟩ (Note: Rare consonants.)	ɡ ⟨g⟩	
Plosive and Affricate	Tenuis	p ⟨bp⟩	t ⟨dt⟩	tʃ ~ ts ⟨tc⟩	c͜𝼆 ⟨tl⟩	k ⟨gk⟩	ʔ ⟨ʼ⟩
Plosive and Affricate	Aspirated	pʰ ⟨p⟩	tʰ ⟨t⟩	tʃʰ ~ tsʰ ⟨tch⟩		kʰ ⟨k⟩	
Plosive and Affricate	Ejective		tsʼ ⟨tsʼ⟩		c͜𝼆ʼ ⟨tlʼ⟩	kʼ ⟨kʼ⟩	
Fricative		f ⟨f⟩	ɬ ⟨lh⟩	s ⟨s⟩		x ⟨kh⟩	h ⟨h⟩
Rhotic			ɾ ⟨r⟩				
Approximant			l ⟨l⟩		j ⟨y⟩	w ⟨w⟩	

Tc and dz are [tʃ] and [dʒ] in the northwestern dialect, but often [ts] and [dz] or even [z] in the southeast. [tsʰ] instead of [tʃʰ] for tch occurs but is less common.

/c͜𝼆ʼ/ before /u, w/ is [k𝼄ʼ].

==== Clicks ====
	Laminal Denti-alveolar	Apical postalveolar	Lateral palatal
Nasal	ŋǀ ⟨nc⟩	ŋǃ ⟨nq⟩	ŋǁ ⟨nx⟩
Voiced	ɡǀ ⟨gc⟩	ɡǃ ⟨gq⟩	ɡǁ ⟨gx⟩
Tenuis	kǀ ⟨c⟩	kǃ ⟨q⟩	kǁ ⟨x⟩
Aspirated	kǀʰ ⟨ch⟩	kǃʰ ⟨qh⟩	kǁʰ ⟨xh⟩
Glottalised	ᵑǀˀ ⟨cʼ⟩	ᵑǃˀ ⟨qʼ⟩	ᵑǁˀ ⟨xʼ⟩

The clicks in Sandawe are not particularly loud, when compared to better known click languages in southern Africa. The lateral click [kǁ] can be confused with the palatal lateral ejective affricate [c𝼆ʼ] even by native speakers. With the postalveolar clicks, the tongue often slaps the bottom of the mouth, and this slap may be louder than the actual release of the click. Wright et al. transcribe this slapped click with sublingual percussive with the extended-IPA symbol ⟨ǃ¡⟩. The voiced clicks are uncommon, being found in a few words such as gqokomi 'greater kudu' and gcingco (sp. bird). Labialized clicks are found in word-initial position.

The glottalized click phonation is something like creaky voice, not an ejective. In initial position, the glottis is closed during the entire occlusion of the click, and not opened until after the release burst. In medial position, the glottis is closed after the velar closure [ŋ] and before the forward closure, but opened before the click release. Such clicks are not nasalized all the way through; in some tokens they are simply prenasalized glottalized clicks, [ŋkǃˀ], bearing in mind that the superscript ⟨ˀ⟩ implies coarticulation (that is, that it is pronounced together with the [k], not after).

The practical orthography is based on Xhosa and Zulu.

=== Tone ===
Hunziker et al. (2008) transcribe seven phonetic tones: high [á], mid [ā], low [à], high falling [â], mid falling [ā̀], low falling [ȁ], and rising [ǎː] (on long vowels only). In Sandawe orthography, they are written as exactly with their IPA spelling, but the rising tone is marked as ǎ.

High and low tones are analyzed as the basic tone configurations. However, the high-falling tone is contrastive, for example in tsʼâ 'water', but it also occurs often due to a sequence of tones. The mid tone does not occur initially. Hunziker et al. analyze it as a downstepped high tone: //H-L-H// is realized as [H-H-M]. This rightward shift on the tones is a general process in Sandawe. This analysis requires the assumption of floating low tones carried by consonant clusters, and thought to reflect a historical vowel which has been deleted. The low and mid falling tones are a prosodic effect, found on final syllables, or on penultimate syllables followed by a voiceless vowel; this leftward shift of tone before voiceless vowels (which by their nature cannot carry tone) is another general process of Sandawe. Rising tone is only found on long vowels and can be analyzed as a low-high sequence.

Thus at a phonemic level, high, low, falling, and downstep are contrastive.

=== Phonotactics ===
The majority of Sandawe syllables are CV. Morpheme-initially, consonant clusters are of the form Cw; these are not found in the middle of morphemes. Most consonants are attested in this Cw sequence apart from the labials, the glottals (ʼ, h), sonorants (r, l, y, w), and the rather infrequent consonants n, d, dl, & the voiced clicks, which may simply be gaps in attestation. The rounded vowels o, u are not found after Cw sequences. Vowel initial syllables, as in cèú 'buffalo', are not found initially, though initial glottal stop is not written (íóó /ʔíóː/ 'mother').

Glottal stops /ʔ/ are found as syllable codas, though these may be released in an echo vowel in some circumstances. Hunziker et al. prefer to analyze these are final consonants, because the quality of the echo vowel is predictable, and otherwise this is the only place where the vowels /e/. /a/, /o/ would have voiceless allophones.

Hunziker et al. find complementary distribution between homorganic NC clusters, which occur only medially (there are no word-final nasal consonants), and nasal vowels, which they only transcribe word finally. It would therefore seem that NC clusters are the realization of a preceding nasal vowel.

Other final consonants are found as consonant clusters in the middle of a word. Historically, these are presumably due to vowel elision, as evidenced by records from the early 20th century and also by tone patterns. In the northwestern dialect, words are found with final consonants where tonal patterns suggest there was once a voiceless final vowel, and where the southeastern dialect retains a voiceless i or u.

== Grammar ==
=== Pronouns ===
Free pronouns
		singular	plural
1st person		tsi	sũũ
2nd person		hapu	sĩĩ
3rd person	masc.	he-we	he-so
3rd person	fem.	he-su	he-so

Pronominal suffixes
		singular	plural
1st person		-és	-wà
2nd person		-i	-è
3rd person	masc.	-à	-ʔà
3rd person	fem.	-sà	-ʔà

=== Syllable structure ===
Sandawe syllables are usually of the form CV; in monosyllabic words, word-final nasals are not uncommon, CV(N). Sometimes other consonants are found in word-final position, but this is most probably the result of deletion of word-final voiceless vowels.

A syllabic nasal m is found in Swahili loanwords. The most common word structure is disyllabic with or without long vowels (CV(ː)CV(ː)), according to De Voogt (1992).

=== Nouns ===
Although nouns can be masculine or feminine, there is usually no particular marker that indicates the gender. Many singular feminine human nouns are marked by the ending -sù, whereas some singular masculine human nouns end in -é. Additionally, definite human feminine nouns must be marked with the suffix -sù, often repeating marking:

ncûmsù-n-sù
wife-DEF-F
'the wife'

Gender assignment for most non-human animates as well as inanimates is largely unpredictable. However, according to Steeman (2011), all body parts are masculine, bigger plants are masculine while smaller plants are feminine, machinery nouns new to the Sandawe (whose names are typically borrowed from Swahili) are usually feminine, and deverbal nouns representing acts (nominalizations) are masculine. According to Eaton (2010), a masculine noun can be made a diminutive by treating it as a feminine noun.

According to Eaton (2010), definite plural nouns are marked with the suffix -khéé, while definite associative plurals are marked with the suffix -khì. According to Steeman (2011), definite human plurals are marked with -sò.

=== Adjectives ===
The same roots may be used as adjectives or verbs according to Kagaya (1993:ix).

=== Syntax ===
Basic word order in Sandawe is SOV according to De Voogt (1992). However, word order in the Sandawe sentence is very flexible due to the presence of several 'subject identification strategies'.

Sample sentence (mid tones are not marked):

úte-s kxʼaré-és hàʔǃà
yesterday-I boy-I called
'Yesterday I called a boy.'

An article in Studies in African Linguistics, Volume 10, Number 3, 1979, by Gerard Dalgish, describes these 'subject identification strategies' in detail. Numerous permutations of sentence constituents are allowed in certain tenses, the pattern being: (a) the first constituent is the subject or (b) any non-subject that is first in the sentence must be marked for the subject. Non-subject constituents include verbs, a progressive marker, objects, indirect objects, adverbs, prepositional phrases, complementizers. Similar results are obtained in WH-Questions.

=== Tone ===
Elderkin (1989) analyzes Sandawe as having two level tones (High, Low) and two contour tones (Falling, Rising). His thesis considers the behavior of tone at word-, sentence- and discourse-level. De Voogt (1992) and Kagaya (1993) list three level tones (High, Mid, Low) and two contour tones (Falling, Rising).

== Classification ==
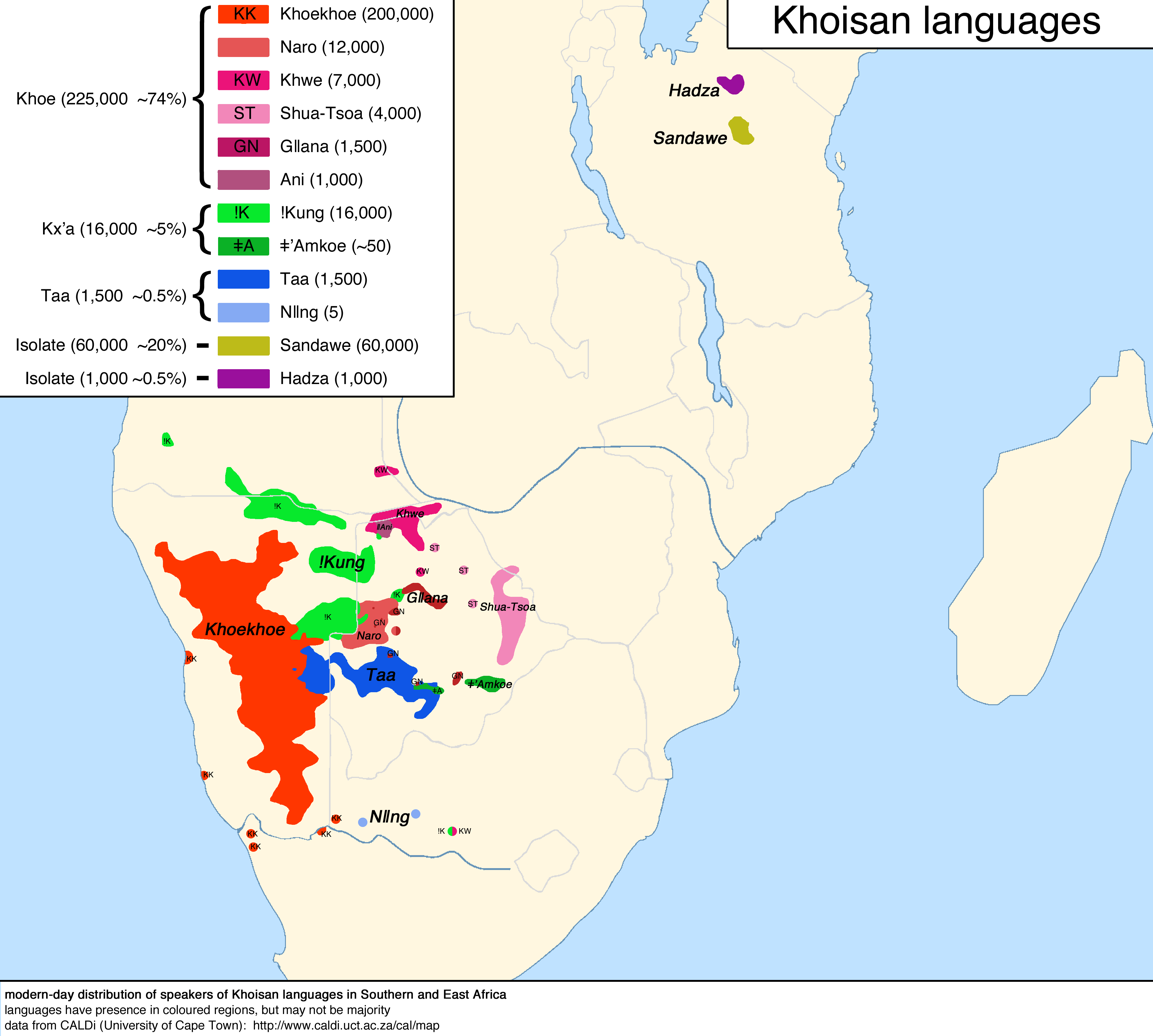
Map of the "Khoisan" languages; Sandawe is shaded olive.

The most promising candidate as a relative of Sandawe are the Khoe languages of Botswana and Namibia. Most of the putative cognates Greenberg (1976) gives as evidence for Sandawe being a Khoisan language in fact tie Sandawe to Khoe. Gueldemann and Elderkin have strengthened that connection, with several dozen likely cognates, while casting doubts on other Khoisan connections. Although there are currently not enough comparanda to reconstruct a Proto-Khoe–Sandawe language, there are enough to suggest that the connection is real. However, other linguists have criticized the proposal as cherry-picking among a large number of non-matching pronominal forms.

The pronominal system is quite similar:

	Sandawe	Proto-Khoe–Kwadi
1sg PN	tsi	*ti (Kwadi tʃi)
2sg PN	ha-	*sa
3 PN base	he-	xa (Kwadi ha-)
3ms suffix	-w(e), -m	(Khoe *-bV, *-mV)
3fs suffix	su	(Khoe *-sV)

These may cast some light on the development of clicks. For example, the Sandawe word for 'horn', tlana, may be a cognate with the root nǁâ found throughout the Khoe family. This and other words suggests that clicks may form from consonant clusters when the first vowel of a word is lost: *tlana > *tlna > ǁna (nǁa).

Another word common to Sandawe and Khoe, the numeral haka 'four', is also found in the neighboring Cushitic languages Aasax and Kwʼadza, and was perhaps borrowed into them from Sandawe.

Since the Khoe family appears to have migrated to southern Africa from the northeast, it may be that Sandawe is closer to their common homeland than the modern Khoe languages are.

== See also ==
- Click language
- Hadza language
- Khoisan languages
