= Palatal consonant =

Consonants articulated with the body of the tongue raised against the roof of the mouth

Palatals are consonants articulated with the body of the tongue raised against the hard palate (the middle part of the roof of the mouth). Consonants with the tip of the tongue curled back against the palate are called retroflex.

== Ambiguity of terminology ==
The term palatal is commonly used more loosely for postalveolar consonants that are laminal, palatalized, or both, if there are no true palatals that contrast with them (that is, often referring to alveolo-palatal consonants). This is especially the case with the IPA letters ⟨ɲ⟩ and ⟨ʎ⟩, which would often be more accurately transcribed as ⟨n̠ʲ⟩ and ⟨l̠ʲ⟩. Palato-alveolar consonants such as ⟨ʃ⟩ and ⟨ʒ⟩ are also frequently called just palatal.

Palatal consonants are occasionally called domal or cacuminal (/kəˈkjuːmɪnəl/), though these terms are usually restricted to retroflex consonants (apico-domal, apico-prepalatal, apico-palatal, subapico-prepalatal, or subapico-palatal), with (alveolo-)palatal restricted to laminal (lamino-domal, lamino-prepalatal, or lamino-palatal) or dorsal (dorso-prepalatal or dorso-palatal) consonants.

Occasionally the term palatal may also be used to refer to palatovelar consonants (that is, palatalized or advanced velar consonants; also sometimes called postpalatal or prevelar consonants). Conversely, occasionally the term palatovelar may be used to refer to more typical palatal consonants.

== Characteristics ==
The most common type of palatal consonant is the extremely common approximant [j], which ranks among the ten most common sounds in the world's languages. The nasal [ɲ] is also common, occurring in around 35 percent of the world's languages, in most of which its equivalent obstruent is not the stop [c], but the affricate [t͡ʃ]. Only a few languages in northern Eurasia, the Americas and central Africa contrast palatal stops with postalveolar affricates—as in Hungarian, Czech, Latvian, Macedonian, Slovak, Turkish and Albanian.

Consonants with other primary articulations may be palatalized, that is, accompanied by the raising of the tongue surface towards the hard palate. For example, English [ʃ] (spelled sh) has such a palatal component, although its primary articulation involves the tip of the tongue and the upper gum (this type of articulation is called palatoalveolar).

In phonology, alveolo-palatal, palatoalveolar and palatovelar consonants are commonly grouped as palatals, since these categories rarely contrast with true palatals. Sometimes palatalized alveolars or dentals can be analyzed in this manner as well.

== Distinction from similar articulations ==
Palatal consonants can be distinguished from apical palatalized consonants and consonant clusters of a consonant and the palatal approximant [j]. The common laminal "palatalized" postalveolars, which rarely contrast with palatals, technically have a unique place of articulation and may be more accurately described as alveolo-palatal consonants. Palatal consonants have their primary articulation toward or in contact with the hard palate, whereas palatalized consonants have a primary articulation in some other area and a secondary articulation involving movement towards the hard palate. Palatal and palatalized consonants are both single phonemes, whereas a sequence of a consonant and [j] is logically two phonemes. However, (post)palatal consonants in general do not contrast with palatalized velars, which in theory have slightly wider place of articulation than postpalatals.

Irish distinguishes the dorsal palatal nasal /ɲ/ (slender ng) from both the laminal alveolo-palatal nasal ("fortis") /ȵ/ (slender nn) and the apical palatalized alveolar nasal ("lenis") /nʲ/ (slender n), nonetheless most modern Irish speakers may either merge the latter two or depalatalize the apical palatalized consonant. So is the difference between the two Migueleño Chiquitano stops. In both languages alveolo-palatal consonants correspond to the palatalization or slender of alveolars while palatal consonants correspond to the palatalization or slender of velars.

Spanish marginally distinguishes palatal consonants from sequences of a dental and the palatal approximant, e.g. in lleísmo Spanish the laterals ll (/l̠ʲ/→ʎ) and li (/lj/→lj), and for all Spanish speakers, in the case of nasals:

- uñón /uȵon/→[uɲ̟on] "large nail"

unión /unjon/→[unjon] "union"

So is the difference between Russian clusters ня and нъя. However, phonetically speaking, the Spanish one is simultaneous alveolo-palatal and dento-alveolar or dento-alveolo-palatal while the Russian soft one is alveolopalatal laminal (except for /rʲ/ which is apical with a secondary articulation). Neither are true palatals like the Irish one.

Sometimes the term palatal is used imprecisely to mean "palatalized". Also, languages that have sequences of consonants and /j/, but no separate palatal or palatalized consonants (e.g. English), will often pronounce the sequence with /j/ as a single palatal or palatalized consonant. This is due to the principle of least effort and is an example of the general phenomenon of coarticulation. (On the other hand, Spanish speakers can be careful to pronounce /nj/ as two separate sounds to avoid possible confusion with /ɲ/.)

== Examples ==
For a table of examples of palatal /ɲ ʎ/ in the Romance languages, see Palatalization (sound change) § Mouillé.

IPA	Description	Example			
IPA	Description	Language	Orthography	IPA	Meaning
ɲ̊	voiceless palatal nasal	Iaai	[ɲ̊øːk]		'to dedicate'
ɲ	voiced palatal nasal	Malay	banyak	[baɲaʔ]	many
c	voiceless palatal plosive	Hungarian	hattyú	[hɒcːuː]	swan
ɟ	voiced palatal plosive	Latvian	ģimene	[ɟimene]	family
c͡ç	voiceless palatal affricate	Skolt Sámi	sääˊmǩiõll	[ɕa̟ːmʰc͡çjɘhlː]	'Skolt Sami'
ɟ͡ʝ	voiced palatal affricate	Skolt Sámi	vuõˊlǧǧem	[vʲuɘlɟ͡ʝːɛm]	'I leave'
ç	voiceless palatal fricative	German	nicht	[nɪçt]	not
ʝ	voiced palatal fricative	Spanish	rayo	[raʝo]	lightning bolt
ȷ̊	voiceless palatal approximant	English	huge	[j̊ʉːdʒ]	
j	voiced palatal approximant	English	yes	[jɛs]	
c͜𝼆	voiceless palatal lateral affricate	Hadza	tlhakate	[c͜𝼆ʰakate]	'rhinoceros'
ɟ͡ʎ̝	voiced palatal lateral affricate	Sandawe	dlani	[ɟʎ̝àní]	'arrow'
𝼆	voiceless palatal lateral fricative	Dahalo	[𝼆aːbu]		'leaf'
ʎ̝	voiced palatal lateral fricative	Jebero	[iˈʎ̝apa]		'shotgun'
ʎ	voiced palatal lateral approximant	Italian	gli	[ʎi]	the (masculine plural)
ʎ̮	voiced palatal lateral flap	Ilgar	[miʎ̮arɡu]		Mildyagru
cʼ	palatal ejective stop	Hausa	[cʼaːɽa]		'grass'
c͜𝼆ʼ	palatal lateral ejective affricate	Hadza	[mitc͜𝼆ʼa]		'bone'
ʄ̥ (ƈ)	voiceless palatal implosive	Ngiti	kátdyɛ̀kɛ̀	[káʄ̥ɛ̀kɛ̀]	'sorghum'
ʄ	voiced palatal implosive	Swahili	hujambo	[huʄambo]	hello
k͡ǂ q͡ǂ ɡ͡ǂ ɢ͡ǂ ŋ͡ǂ ɴ͡ǂ	palatal clicks (many distinct consonants)	Nǁng	ǂoo	[k͡ǂoo]	man, male

== See also ==
- Palatalization (phonetics)
- Palatalization (sound change)
- Place of articulation
- Index of phonetics articles

== Sources ==
- Ladefoged, Peter; Maddieson, Ian (1996). The Sounds of the World's Languages. Oxford: Blackwell. ISBN 0-631-19815-6.
- Valenzuela, Pilar M.; Gussenhoven, Carlos (2013). "Shiwilu (Jebero)". Journal of the International Phonetic Association. 43 (1): 97–106. doi:10.1017/S0025100312000370.

Place →	Labial					Coronal										Dorsal					Laryngeal			
Manner ↓	Bilabial		Labiodental		Linguolabial		Dental		Alveolar		Postalveolar		Retroflex		(Alveolo-)palatal		Velar		Uvular		Pharyngeal/epiglottal		Glottal	
Nasal	m̥	m	ɱ̊	ɱ		n̼	n̪̊	n̪	n̥	n	n̠̊	n̠	ɳ̊	ɳ	ɲ̊	ɲ	ŋ̊	ŋ	ɴ̥	ɴ				
Plosive	p	b	p̪	b̪	t̼	d̼	t̪	d̪	t	d			ʈ	ɖ	c	ɟ	k	ɡ	q	ɢ	ʡ		ʔ	
Sibilant affricate							t̪s̪	d̪z̪	ts	dz	t̠ʃ	d̠ʒ	tʂ	dʐ	tɕ	dʑ								
Non-sibilant affricate	pɸ	bβ	p̪f	b̪v			t̪θ	d̪ð	tɹ̝̊	dɹ̝	t̠ɹ̠̊˔	d̠ɹ̠˔			cç	ɟʝ	kx	ɡɣ	qχ	ɢʁ	ʡʜ	ʡʢ	ʔh	
Sibilant fricative							s̪	z̪	s	z	ʃ	ʒ	ʂ	ʐ	ɕ	ʑ								
Non-sibilant fricative	ɸ	β	f	v	θ̼	ð̼	θ	ð	θ̠	ð̠	ɹ̠̊˔	ɹ̠˔	ɻ̊˔	ɻ˔	ç	ʝ	x	ɣ	χ	ʁ	ħ	ʕ	h	ɦ
Approximant		β̞		ʋ				ð̞		ɹ		ɹ̠		ɻ		j		ɰ						˷
Tap/flap		ⱱ̟		ⱱ					ɾ̥	ɾ			ɽ̊	ɽ						ɢ̆		ʡ̆		
Trill	ʙ̥	ʙ							r̥	r		r̠	ɽ̊r̥	ɽr					ʀ̥	ʀ	ʜ	ʢ		
Lateral affricate									tɬ	dɮ			tꞎ	d𝼅	c𝼆	ɟʎ̝	k𝼄	ɡʟ̝						
Lateral fricative							ɬ̪		ɬ	ɮ			ꞎ	𝼅	𝼆	ʎ̝	𝼄	ʟ̝						
Lateral approximant								l̪	l̥	l		l̠	ɭ̊	ɭ	ʎ̥	ʎ	ʟ̥	ʟ		ʟ̠				
Lateral tap/flap									ɺ̥	ɺ			𝼈̊	𝼈		ʎ̆		ʟ̆						

		BL	LD	D	A	PA	RF	P	V	U
Implosive	Voiced	ɓ			ɗ		ᶑ	ʄ	ɠ	ʛ
Implosive	Voiceless	ɓ̥			ɗ̥		ᶑ̊	ʄ̊	ɠ̊	ʛ̥
Ejective	Stop	pʼ			tʼ		ʈʼ	cʼ	kʼ	qʼ
Ejective	Affricate		p̪fʼ	t̪θʼ	tsʼ	t̠ʃʼ	tʂʼ	tɕʼ	kxʼ	qχʼ
Ejective	Fricative	ɸʼ	fʼ	θʼ	sʼ	ʃʼ	ʂʼ	ɕʼ	xʼ	χʼ
Ejective	Lateral affricate				tɬʼ			c𝼆ʼ	k𝼄ʼ	q𝼄ʼ
Ejective	Lateral fricative				ɬʼ					
Click (top: velar; bottom: uvular)	Tenuis	kʘ qʘ		kǀ qǀ	kǃ qǃ		k𝼊 q𝼊	kǂ qǂ		
Click (top: velar; bottom: uvular)	Voiced	ɡʘ ɢʘ		ɡǀ ɢǀ	ɡǃ ɢǃ		ɡ𝼊 ɢ𝼊	ɡǂ ɢǂ		
Click (top: velar; bottom: uvular)	Nasal	ŋʘ ɴʘ		ŋǀ ɴǀ	ŋǃ ɴǃ		ŋ𝼊 ɴ𝼊	ŋǂ ɴǂ	ʞ	
Click (top: velar; bottom: uvular)	Tenuis lateral				kǁ qǁ					
Click (top: velar; bottom: uvular)	Voiced lateral				ɡǁ ɢǁ					
Click (top: velar; bottom: uvular)	Nasal lateral				ŋǁ ɴǁ					
