= Hadza =

Hadza may refer to:

- Hadza people, or Hadzabe, a hunter-gatherer people of Tanzania
- Hadza language, the isolate language spoken by the Hadza people
