= Ndorobo language =

Ndorobo or Dorobo may refer to:

== Languages spoken by "Dorobo peoples" of Kenya and Tanzania ==
- Aasáx language
- Aramanik language
- Kisankasa language
- Mediak language
- Mosiro language
- Omaio language
- Serengeti-Dorobo language

== Other languages ==
- Dorobo, a spurious language purportedly belonging to the Kuliak languages
