= Asa people =

Ethnic group from Manyara Region of Tanzania

The Assa are an ethnic group based on the Maasai Steppe in Manyara Region, Tanzania. In 1999, they were estimated to number around 300 individuals, after the eastern Assa were assimilated into the Maasai. The Assa once spoke the Aasáx language, ambiguously called "Dorobo", which probably belonged to the Afro-Asiatic language family,

== See also ==
- List of ethnic groups in Tanzania
- Manyara Region
