= Serengeti-Dorobo language =

Extinct language of Tanzania

"Serengeti-Dorobo"
- Region: Tanzania
- Extinct: 20th century
- Language family: unclassified

Language codes
- ISO 639-3: None (mis)
- Glottolog: sere1258

Serengeti-Dorobo (a nonce name) is an obscure "Dorobo" language, a few words of which were recorded in the late 19th century by Oscar Baumann. From the little data available, the language is not obviously related to any other, though the numeral system is Nilotic. It is not the only "Dorobo" language formerly spoken in the Serengeti.

== Vocabulary ==
A few paragraphs were recorded by Baumann (1894, p. 366), but without any word-by-word translations.

Numerals are as follows. Most resemble those of neighboring Nilotic languages.

1 napu (kinavéta napó 'one cattle') [cf. Maasai fem. nabo]
2 ennya [cf. Datooga iyeny, Omotik ainia]
3 uni [cf. Maasai fem. uni]
4 ongwan [cf. Maasai fem. ongwan, Datooga, Okiek angwan]
5 mot [cf. Datooga mut, Okiek mʊʊt, Omotik moot]
6 lei [cf. Datooga la, Okiek ile, Maasai ilɛ, Omotik lai]
7 oner
8 sissie [cf. Datooga sis]
9 naudó [cf. Okiek naudo, Maasai fem. naaudo]
10 gaget
15 gaget aꭓ mot
20 tegenos [cf. Okiek, Maasai tikitam]
30 tegenos aꭓ gaget

Some other words include:

enoloïdugo 'zebra'

kinavéta napó 'one head of cattle'

== Sample texts ==
These examples are recorded in the journal Mother Tongue:

Ehorra evehóssore eméta emehoréta imidátene evoharyét engirie koraá engátena háho panawádada gigu utie kiutïe leïdos moo egiténaha hamúmia enoloïdugo nadodoivire kodonuha.

'We went out and carried our arrows and bows and quivers. We went up to a tree and rested. We made an enclosure and left 2 men there behind. We saw zebras. Here went 10 men, there 10 men and surrounded the game. The zebras were therein and were killed'.

Nagenavéna kavendá gawédia totowó kióno kinávesik kiono kinevésse tégenos kisilie kópowa hádanyen kópowa damaréta hádanyen kópowa damaréta daveïe, daveïe kaldeni kanda kinevésse ártam.

'We went to war (raid), got cattle, killed 20 men. When we came into the village, we gave the shaman/witch doctor 10 head of cattle'.

== See also ==
- Omaio language

== Notes ==
- Oscar Baumann (Berlin, 1894), Durch Massailand zur Nilquelle. Reisen und Forschungen der Massai-Expedition des deutschen Antisklaverei-Komite in den Jahren 1891–1893
