= Dorobo peoples =

Group of unrelated hunter-gatherer ethnic groups of Kenya and Tanzania

Dorobo (or Ndorobo, Wadorobo, dorobo, Torobo) is a derogatory umbrella term for several unrelated hunter-gatherer groups of Kenya and Tanzania. They comprised client groups to the Maasai and did not practice cattle pastoralism.

Kikuyu tradition says that intermarriage with the Gumba produced the Ndorobo people, who were of a stature in between the Gumba and Kikuyu.

== Etymology ==
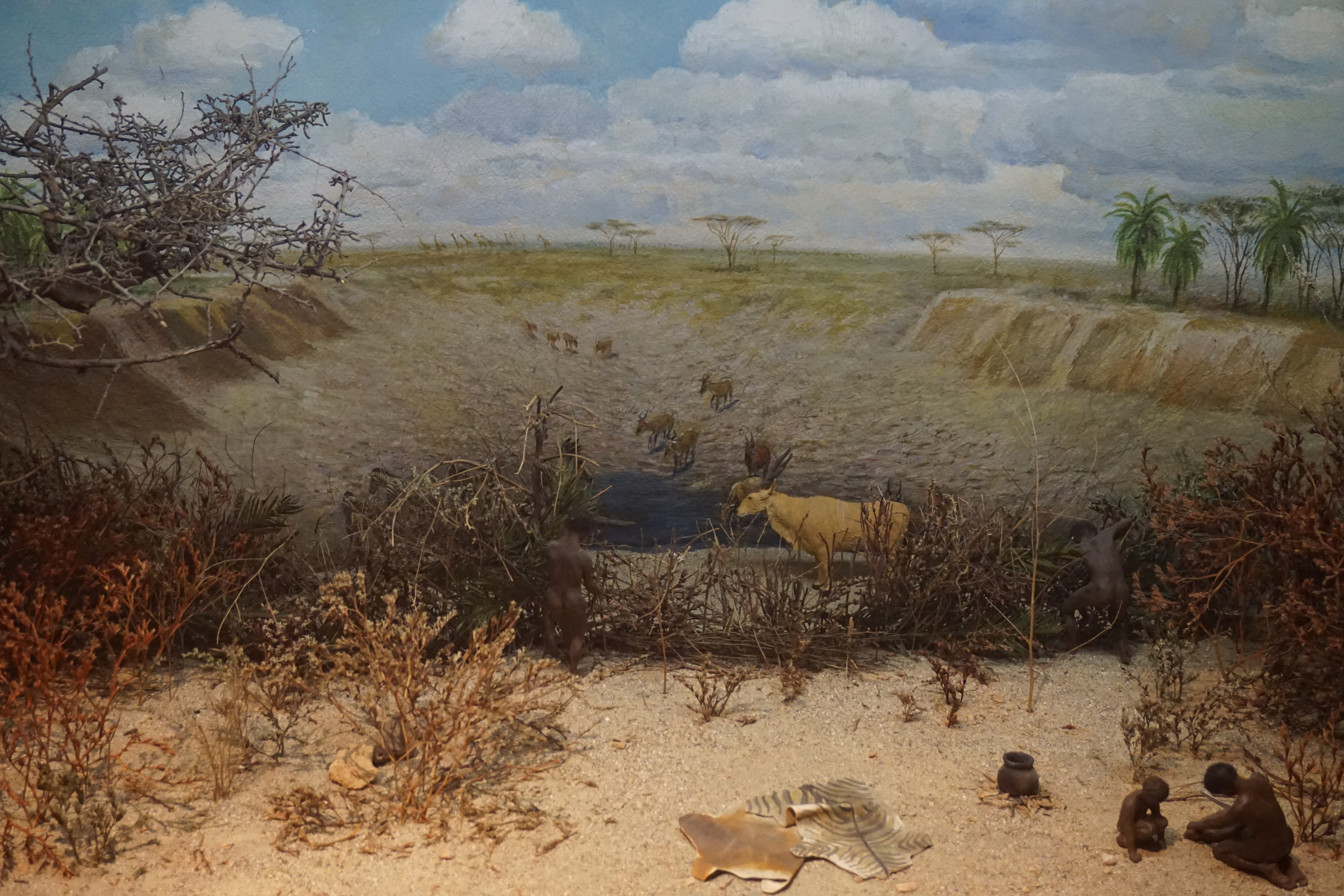
The Water Hole Ambush/Hunters: The Wandorobo diorama at the Milwaukee Public Museum

The term 'Dorobo' derives from the Maa expression il-tóróbò (singular ol-torróbònì) 'hunters; the ones without cattle'. Living from hunting wild animals implies being primitive, and being without cattle implies being very poor in the pastoralist Maa culture.

== Classifications ==
In the past it has been assumed that all Dorobo were of Southern Nilotic origin; accordingly, the term Dorobo was thought to denote several closely related ethnic groups.

Groups that have been referred to as Dorobo include:

- Kaplelach Okiek and Kipchornwonek Okiek (Nilotic; Rift Valley Province, Kenya)
- Sengwer
- Mukogodo-Maasai (the former Yaaku, sometimes Aramanik) (Yaaku language; Laikipia District, Rift Valley Province, Kenya)
- Aasax (Aasa language; northern Tanzania)
- Akie (sometimes Mosíro, which is an Akie clan name) (Nilotic, northern Tanzania)
- Mediak (Kalenjin, northern Tanzania)
- Kisankasa (Kalenjin, northern Tanzania)
- Aramanik (Kalenjin, Tanzania)
- Mosiro (Kalenjin, Tanzania)
- Omotik

== Relations with neighbours ==
A historical survey of 17 Dorobo groups in northern Kenya found that they each maintained a close rapport with their surrounding territory through their foraging. Speaking the same language as their nomadic pastoralist neighbours, they would maintain peaceful relations with them and accepted a lower status. Occasional intermigration and intermarriage between the two groups was even possible. If the political landscape shifted and new pastoralists entered the area, then the local Dorobo would switch to the new language and build up new relations, while clinging to their territorial niche.

== See also ==
- Dorobo language
- Degere
