= Kisankasa people =

Ethnic group from Arusha Region of Tanzania

The Kisankasa are an ethnic and linguistic group based in Arusha Region's Ngorongoro District and Mara Region in northern Tanzania. In 1987 the Kisankasa population was estimated to number 4,670. The Kisankasa are distinct from other groups often called Dorobo.
