= Voiceless palatal lateral affricate =

Consonantal sound represented by ⟨cʎ̥˔⟩ or ⟨c𝼆⟩ in IPA

c𝼆

cʎ̥˔

Audio sample
- source · help
Image

A voiceless palatal lateral affricate is a type of consonantal sound, used in some spoken languages. There are two ways it can be transcribed into IPA: extIPA ⟨c͜𝼆⟩ or traditional ⟨c͜ʎ̥˔⟩.

== Features ==
Features of a voiceless palatal lateral affricate:

- Its manner of articulation is affricate, which means it is produced by first stopping the airflow entirely, then allowing air flow through a constricted channel at the place of articulation, causing turbulence.
- Its place of articulation is palatal, which means it is articulated with the middle or back part of the tongue raised to the hard palate.
- Its phonation is voiceless, which means it is produced without vibrations of the vocal cords.
- It is an oral consonant, which means that air is not allowed to escape through the nose.
- It is a lateral consonant, which means it is produced by directing the airstream over the sides of the tongue, rather than down the middle.
- Its airstream mechanism is pulmonic, which means it is articulated by pushing air only with the intercostal muscles and abdominal muscles, as in most speech sounds.

== Occurrence ==
The sound occurs in Hadza and, as an ejective (see), in Dahalo.

| Language | Word | IPA | Meaning | Notes |
|---|---|---|---|---|
| Hadza | tlhakate | c͜𝼆ʰakate | "rhinoceros" (if dead) | Contrasts with ejective and aspirated forms. Although initial contact varies from alveolar to palatal, frication is always palatal. |
| Hadza | tlaa | c͜𝼆aʔa | "to meet, to follow" | Contrasts with ejective and aspirated forms. Although initial contact varies from alveolar to palatal, frication is always palatal. |

| Place → | Labial | | | | | Coronal | | | | | | | | | | Dorsal | | | | | Laryngeal | | | |
| Manner ↓ | Bilabial | | Labiodental | | Linguolabial | | Dental | | Alveolar | | Postalveolar | | Retroflex | | (Alveolo-)palatal | | Velar | | Uvular | | Pharyngeal/epiglottal | | Glottal | |
|---|---|---|---|---|---|---|---|---|---|---|---|---|---|---|---|---|---|---|---|---|---|---|---|---|
| Nasal | m̥ | m | ɱ̊ | ɱ | | n̼ | n̪̊ | n̪ | n̥ | n | n̠̊ | n̠ | ɳ̊ | ɳ | ɲ̊ | ɲ | ŋ̊ | ŋ | ɴ̥ | ɴ | | | | |
| Plosive | p | b | p̪ | b̪ | t̼ | d̼ | t̪ | d̪ | t | d | | | ʈ | ɖ | c | ɟ | k | ɡ | q | ɢ | ʡ | | ʔ | |
| Sibilant affricate | | | | | | | t̪s̪ | d̪z̪ | ts | dz | t̠ʃ | d̠ʒ | tʂ | dʐ | tɕ | dʑ | | | | | | | | |
| Non-sibilant affricate | pɸ | bβ | p̪f | b̪v | | | t̪θ | d̪ð | tɹ̝̊ | dɹ̝ | t̠ɹ̠̊˔ | d̠ɹ̠˔ | | | cç | ɟʝ | kx | ɡɣ | qχ | ɢʁ | ʡʜ | ʡʢ | ʔh | |
| Sibilant fricative | | | | | | | s̪ | z̪ | s | z | ʃ | ʒ | ʂ | ʐ | ɕ | ʑ | | | | | | | | |
| Non-sibilant fricative | ɸ | β | f | v | θ̼ | ð̼ | θ | ð | θ̠ | ð̠ | ɹ̠̊˔ | ɹ̠˔ | ɻ̊˔ | ɻ˔ | ç | ʝ | x | ɣ | χ | ʁ | ħ | ʕ | h | ɦ |
| Approximant | | β̞ | | ʋ | | | | ð̞ | | ɹ | | ɹ̠ | | ɻ | | j | | ɰ | | | | | | ˷ |
| Tap/flap | | ⱱ̟ | | ⱱ | | | | | ɾ̥ | ɾ | | | ɽ̊ | ɽ | | | | | | ɢ̆ | | ʡ̆ | | |
| Trill | ʙ̥ | ʙ | | | | | | | r̥ | r | | r̠ | ɽ̊r̥ | ɽr | | | | | ʀ̥ | ʀ | ʜ | ʢ | | |
| Lateral affricate | | | | | | | | | tɬ | dɮ | | | tꞎ | d𝼅 | c𝼆 | ɟʎ̝ | k𝼄 | ɡʟ̝ | | | | | | |
| Lateral fricative | | | | | | | ɬ̪ | | ɬ | ɮ | | | ꞎ | 𝼅 | 𝼆 | ʎ̝ | 𝼄 | ʟ̝ | | | | | | |
| Lateral approximant | | | | | | | | l̪ | l̥ | l | | l̠ | ɭ̊ | ɭ | ʎ̥ | ʎ | ʟ̥ | ʟ | | ʟ̠ | | | | |
| Lateral tap/flap | | | | | | | | | ɺ̥ | ɺ | | | 𝼈̊ | 𝼈 | | ʎ̆ | | ʟ̆ | | | | | | |

| | | BL | LD | D | A | PA | RF | P | V | U |
|---|---|---|---|---|---|---|---|---|---|---|
| Implosive | Voiced | ɓ | | | ɗ | | ᶑ | ʄ | ɠ | ʛ |
| Implosive | Voiceless | ɓ̥ | | | ɗ̥ | | ᶑ̊ | ʄ̊ | ɠ̊ | ʛ̥ |
| Ejective | Stop | pʼ | | | tʼ | | ʈʼ | cʼ | kʼ | qʼ |
| Ejective | Affricate | | p̪fʼ | tθʼ | tsʼ | tʃʼ | tʂʼ | tɕʼ | kxʼ | qχʼ |
| Ejective | Fricative | ɸʼ | fʼ | θʼ | sʼ | ʃʼ | ʂʼ | ɕʼ | xʼ | χʼ |
| Ejective | Lateral affricate | | | | tɬʼ | | | c𝼆ʼ | k𝼄ʼ | q𝼄ʼ |
| Ejective | Lateral fricative | | | | ɬʼ | | | | | |
| Click (top: velar; bottom: uvular) | Tenuis | kʘ qʘ | | kǀ qǀ | kǃ qǃ | | k𝼊 q𝼊 | kǂ qǂ | | |
| Click (top: velar; bottom: uvular) | Voiced | ɡʘ ɢʘ | | ɡǀ ɢǀ | ɡǃ ɢǃ | | ɡ𝼊 ɢ𝼊 | ɡǂ ɢǂ | | |
| Click (top: velar; bottom: uvular) | Nasal | ŋʘ ɴʘ | | ŋǀ ɴǀ | ŋǃ ɴǃ | | ŋ𝼊 ɴ𝼊 | ŋǂ ɴǂ | ʞ | |
| Click (top: velar; bottom: uvular) | Tenuis lateral | | | | kǁ qǁ | | | | | |
| Click (top: velar; bottom: uvular) | Voiced lateral | | | | ɡǁ ɢǁ | | | | | |
| Click (top: velar; bottom: uvular) | Nasal lateral | | | | ŋǁ ɴǁ | | | | | |
