= Omaio language =

Endangered Dorobo language of Tanzania

Omaio
- Kakesio–Makao Dorobo
- Region: Tanzania
- Native speakers: 3 rememberers (2014)
- Language family: unclassified

Language codes
- ISO 639-3: None (mis)
- Glottolog: kake1234

Omaio (Omaiyo) is an obscure Dorobo language of Tanzania. According to interviews with speakers, the people were expelled from the Serengeti in the 1950s to make way for the park. As of 2014, three speakers remember some words of the language, though it had not been spoken since they were children. Based on the few hundred words and phrases that have been collected, the language has not been classified. There is evidence of words that can be traced to contact with speakers of the Maa and Datooga languages, as well as older words from the Southern Nilotic family which may have been inherited or borrowed.

== See also ==
- Serengeti Dorobo language
