= Affricate =

Consonant that begins as a stop and releases as a fricative

IPA: Affricate consonants

Sibilant	ts	dz	tʃ	dʒ
Sibilant	tʂ	dʐ	tɕ	dʑ
Non- sibilant	p̪f	b̪v	t̠ɹ̝̊	d̠ɹ̝
Non- sibilant	cç	ɟʝ	kx	ɡɣ
Non- sibilant	qχ	ɢʁ	ʡʢ	ʔh
Lateral	tɬ	dɮ	tꞎ	d𝼅
Lateral	c𝼆	ɟʎ̝	k𝼄	ɡʟ̝
Ejective	tsʼ	tʃʼ	tʂʼ	kxʼ
Ejective	qχʼ	tɬʼ	c𝼆ʼ	k𝼄ʼ

- IPA help
- audio help
- full chart
- template

An affricate is a consonant that begins as a stop and releases as a fricative, generally with the same place of articulation (most often coronal). It is often difficult to decide if a stop and fricative form a single phoneme or a consonant sequence. English has two affricate phonemes, /t͡ʃ/ and /d͡ʒ/, generally spelled ch and j, respectively.

== Examples ==
The English sounds spelled "ch" and "j" (broadly transcribed as [t͡ʃ] and [d͡ʒ] in the IPA), German and Italian z [t͡s] and Italian z [d͡z] are typical affricates, and sounds like these are fairly common in the world's languages, as are other affricates with similar sounds, such as those in Polish and Chinese. However, voiced affricates other than [d͡ʒ] are relatively uncommon. For several places of articulation they are not attested at all.

Much less common are labiodental affricates, such as [p͡f] in German, Kinyarwanda and Izi, or velar affricates, such as [k͡x] in Tswana (written kg) or in High Alemannic Swiss German dialects. Worldwide, relatively few languages have affricates in these positions even though the corresponding stop consonants, [p] and [k], are common or virtually universal. Also less common are alveolar affricates where the fricative release is lateral, such as the [t͡ɬ] sound found in Nahuatl and Navajo. Some other Athabaskan languages, such as Dene Suline, have unaspirated, aspirated, and ejective series of affricates whose release may be dental, alveolar, postalveolar, or lateral: [t̪͡θ], [t̪͡θʰ], [t̪͡θʼ], [t͡s], [t͡sʰ], [t͡sʼ], [t͡ʃ], [t͡ʃʰ], [t͡ʃʼ], [t͡ɬ], [t͡ɬʰ], and [t͡ɬʼ].

== Notation ==
Affricates are transcribed in the International Phonetic Alphabet by a combination of two letters, one for the stop element and the other for the fricative element. In order to clarify that these form a single consonant, a tie bar may be used. The tie bar appears most commonly above the two letters, but may be placed under them if it fits better there, or simply because it is more legible. For example, in Thus:

⟨p͡f b͡v, p͡ɸ b͡β, t͡s d͡z, t͡ɬ d͡ɮ, t͡ʃ d͡ʒ, t͡ᶘ d͡ᶚ, t͡ɕ d͡ʑ, ʈ͡ʂ ɖ͡ʐ , k͡x ɡ͡ɣ, q͡χ ɢ͡ʁ⟩

or

⟨p͜f b͜v, p͜ɸ b͜β, t͜s d͜z, t͜ɬ d͜ɮ, t͜ʃ d͜ʒ, t͜ɕ d͜ʑ, ʈ͜ʂ ɖ͜ʐ , k͜x ɡ͜ɣ, q͜χ ɢ͜ʁ⟩.

A less common notation indicates the release of the affricate with a superscript:

⟨pᶠ bᵛ, pᶲ bᵝ, tˢ dᶻ, t𐞛 d𐞞, tᶴ dᶾ, t𝿣 d𝿧, tᶝ dᶽ, tᶳ dᶼ, kˣ ɡˠ, qᵡ ɢʶ⟩

This is derived from the IPA convention of indicating other releases with a superscript. However, this convention is more typically used for a fricated release that is too brief to be considered a true affricate.

Though they are no longer standard IPA, ligatures are available in Unicode for the sibilant affricates, which remain in common use:

⟨ʦ ʣ, ʧ ʤ, 𝼜 𝼙, ʨ ʥ, ꭧ ꭦ⟩. (Note: John Laver created the para-IPA letters ⟨ ᶘ ᶚ⟩ for the not-quite retroflex fricatives of Polish sz and ż; the affricates ⟨𝼜 𝼙⟩ are Polish cz and dż.)

The remaining coronal affricates were added to Unicode 18.0 in 2026:

⟨𝼤 𝼟, 𝼢 𝼠, 𝼣 𝼡, 𝼬 𝼫⟩ for [t͜θ] [d͜ð], [t͜ɬ] [d͡ɮ], [t͡ꞎ] [d͡𝼅], [t͜ʆ] [d͡ʓ].

Ligatures ⟨,,, /, ⟩ for the non-coronal affricates [pɸ] [bβ], [pf] [bv], [cç] [ɟʝ], [kx] [ɡɣ]/[gɣ], [qχ] [ɢʁ] have also been used.

Any of these notations can be used to distinguish an affricate from a sequence of plosive plus fricative, which is contrastive in languages such as Polish. However, in languages where there is no such distinction within a syllable, such as English or Turkish, a simple sequence of letters such as ⟨tʃ⟩ is commonly used, with no overt indication that they form an affricate. In such cases the syllable boundary may be written to distinguish the plosive-fricative sequence in petshop /ˈpɛt.ʃɒp/ from the similar affricate in ketchup /ˈkɛtʃʌp/.

In other phonetic transcription systems, such as the Americanist system, affricates may be transcribed with single letters. The affricate [t͜s] may be transcribed as ⟨c⟩ or ⟨ȼ⟩; [d͜z] as ⟨ʒ⟩, ⟨ƶ⟩ or ⟨j⟩; [t͜ʃ] as ⟨c⟩ or ⟨č⟩; [d͡ʒ] as ⟨ǰ⟩, ⟨ǧ⟩ or ⟨ǯ⟩; [t͜ɬ] as ⟨ƛ⟩; and [d͡ɮ] as ⟨λ⟩.

Single letters may also be used with phonemic transcription in IPA: [tʃ] and [dʒ] are sometimes transcribed with the symbols for the palatal stops, ⟨c⟩ and ⟨ɟ⟩, for example in the IPA Handbook.

== Contrast with stop–fricative sequences ==
In some languages, affricates contrast phonemically with stop–fricative sequences at the same place of articulation:

- Polish affricate /t͡ʂ/ in czysta 'clean (f.)' versus stop–fricative /tʂ/ in trzysta 'three hundred'; or affricate /d͡ʐ/ in dżem 'jam' versus stop–fricative /dʐ/ in drzem 'snooze (2nd person singular imperative)';
- Klallam affricate /t͡s/ in k'ʷə́nc 'look at me' versus stop–fricative /ts/ in k'ʷə́nts 'he looks at it'.

The exact phonetic difference varies between languages. In stop–fricative sequences, the stop has a release burst before the fricative starts (which in the case of Klallam is aspirated [tʰs]), but in affricates, the fricative element is the release. Stop–fricatives can be distinguished acoustically from affricates by the rise time of the frication noise, which is shorter for affricates.

In English, /ts/ and /dz/ (nuts, nods) are stop–fricative sequences. They most often contain a morpheme boundary (for example, nuts = nut + s), though there are exceptions such as waltz and adze. The affricates /t͡ʃ/ and /d͡ʒ/, on the other hand, do not allow morpheme boundaries. The phonemic distinction in English between the affricate /t͡ʃ/ and the stop–fricative sequence /t.ʃ/ (found across syllable boundaries) can be observed by minimal pairs such as the following:

- worst ship /ˈwɜːstˈʃɪp/ → [ˌwɜːst.ˈʃɪp]
- worse chip /ˈwɜːsˈt͡ʃɪp/ → [ˌwɜːs.ˈt͡ʃʰɪp]

The /t/ in 'worst ship' may be elided: [wɜːsʃɪp], but that of chip is not.

== Geminate affricates ==
When affricates are geminated, it is usually the duration of the plosive closure that is lengthened, not that of the frication. For example, in most languages /t͜sː/ is pronounced [tːs], not *[tsː]. This is the case with Italian and Japanese. However, Polish has been reported to be more variable, with phonological gemination through rearticulation of the affricate, lengthening of the plosive closure or – less commonly – lengthening of the fricative release, so that /t͜sː/ may be realized as [tsts], [tːs] or [tsː].

== List of affricates ==
In the case of coronals, the symbols ⟨t, d⟩ are normally used for the stop portion of the affricate regardless of place. For example, ⟨t͡ʂ⟩ is commonly seen for ⟨ʈ͡ʂ⟩, ⟨t͡ʃ⟩ for ⟨t̠͡ʃ⟩ and ⟨t͡θ⟩ for ⟨t̪͡θ⟩.

The exemplar languages are ones that have been reported to have these sounds, but in several cases, they may need confirmation.

=== Sibilant affricates ===
Voiceless	Languages	Voiced	Languages
Voiceless alveolar affricate t͡s	Albanian c Georgian ც German z, tz, c Japanese つ/ツ [tsu͍] Kʼicheʼ; Mandarin z (pinyin); Italian z Pashto څ	Voiced alveolar affricate d͡z	Albanian x Georgian ძ Japanese (some dialects); Italian z Pashto ځ
Voiceless dental sibilant affricate t̪͡s̪	Hungarian c Macedonian ц Serbo-Croatian c/ц Polish c	Voiced dental sibilant affricate d̪͡z̪	Hungarian dz Macedonian ѕ Bulgarian дз Polish dz
Voiceless alveolo-palatal affricate t̠͡ɕ	Japanese ち/チ [tɕi] Mandarin j (pinyin); Polish ć, ci Serbo-Croatian ć/ћ Thai จ Vietnamese ch	Voiced alveolo-palatal affricate d̠͡ʑ	Japanese じ/ジ, ぢ/ヂ [dʑi] Polish dź, dzi Serbo-Croatian đ/ђ Korean ㅈ
Voiceless palato-alveolar affricate t̠͡ʃ	Albanian ç English ch, tch Georgian ჩ German tsch Hungarian cs Indonesian c Italian ci, ce Latvian č Lithuanian č Maltese ċ Persian چ Romanian ci, ce Spanish ch Turkish ç Walloon tch	Voiced palato-alveolar affricate d̠͡ʒ	Albanian xh Arabic ج English j, g Georgian ჯ Hungarian dzs Indonesian j Italian gi, ge Latvian dž Lithuanian dž Maltese ġ Romanian gi, ge Turkish c Walloon dj
Voiceless retroflex affricate ʈ͡ʂ	Mandarin zh (pinyin); Polish cz Serbo-Croatian č/ч Slovak č Vietnamese tr	Voiced retroflex affricate ɖ͡ʐ	Polish dż Serbo-Croatian dž/џ Slovak dž

The Northwest Caucasian languages Abkhaz and Ubykh both contrast sibilant affricates at four places of articulation: alveolar, postalveolar, alveolo-palatal and retroflex. They also distinguish voiceless, voiced, and ejective affricates at each of these.

When a language has only one type of affricate, it is usually a sibilant; this is the case in e.g. Arabic ([d̠ʒ]), most dialects of Spanish ([t̠ʃ]), and Thai ([tɕ]).

=== Non-sibilant affricates ===
Sound (voiceless)	IPA	Languages	Sound (voiced)	IPA	Languages
Voiceless bilabial affricate	[pɸ]	Present allophonically in Kaingang and Taos. Not reported as a phoneme in any natural language.	Voiced bilabial affricate	[bβ]	Allophonic in Ghomalaʼ and Shipibo–Konibo
Voiceless labiodental affricate	[p̪f]	German, Teke, XiNkuna Tsonga	Voiced labiodental affricate	[b̪v]	Teke, XiNkuna Tsonga
Voiceless dental non-sibilant affricate	[t̪θ]	New York English, Luo, Dene Suline, Cun, some varieties of Venetian and other North Italian dialects	Voiced dental non-sibilant affricate	[d̪ð]	New York, Dublin, and Maori English, Dene Suline
Voiceless retroflex non-sibilant affricate	[tɻ̝̊]	Mapudungun, Malagasy	Voiced retroflex non-sibilant affricate	[dɻ̝]	Malagasy
Voiceless palatal affricate	[cç]	Skolt Sami (younger speakers), Hungarian (casual speech), Albanian (transcribed as [c]), allophonically in Kaingang	Voiced palatal affricate	[ɟʝ]	Skolt Sami (younger speakers), Hungarian (casual speech), Albanian (transcribed as [ɟ]), some Spanish dialects. Not reported to contrast with a voiced palatal plosive [ɟ]
Voiceless velar affricate	[kx]	Tswana, High Alemannic German	Voiced velar affricate	[ɡɣ]	Allophonic in some English English
Voiceless uvular affricate	[qχ]	Nez Percé, Wolof, Bats, Kabardian, Avar, Tsez. Not reported to contrast with a voiceless uvular plosive [q] in natural languages.	Voiced uvular affricate	[ɢʁ]	Reported from the Raivavae dialect of Austral and Ekagi with a velar lateral allophone [ɡʟ̝] before front vowels.
Voiceless pharyngeal affricate	[ʡħ]	Haida. Not reported to contrast with an epiglottal stop [ʡ]	Voiced pharyngeal affricate	[ʡʕ]	Somali. Pronounced [ʡʕ] or sometimes with weak epiglottal trilling [ʡʢ] initially, otherwise realized as [ʡ]
Voiceless glottal affricate	[ʔh]	Allophonic in Received Pronunciation	Voiced glottal affricate	[ʔɦ]	Not attested in any natural language

=== Lateral affricates ===
Sound (voiceless)	IPA	Languages	Sound (voiced)	IPA	Languages
Voiceless alveolar lateral affricate	[tɬ]	Cherokee, Nahuatl, Navajo, Tswana, etc.	Voiced alveolar lateral affricate	[dɮ]	Gwich'in, Sandawe.
Voiceless retroflex lateral affricate	[ʈꞎ]	Bhadrawahi, apical post-alveolar. Realization of phonemic /ʈl/ in Kamkata-vari and Kamvari.	Voiced retroflex lateral affricate	[ɖ𝼅]	Bhadrawahi, apical post-alveolar. Realization of phonemic /ɖl/ in Kamkata-vari and Kamviri.
Voiceless palatal lateral affricate	[c𝼆]	as ejective [c𝼆ʼ] in Dahalo; in free variation with [t𝼆] in Hadza.	Voiced palatal lateral affricate	[ɟʎ̝]	Allophonic in Sandawe.
Voiceless velar lateral affricate	[k𝼄]	as a prevelar in Archi and as an ejective [k𝼄ʼ] in Zulu, also exist in the Laghuu language.	Voiced velar lateral affricate	[ɡʟ̝]	Laghuu.

=== Trilled affricates ===
Sound (voiceless)	IPA	Languages	Sound (voiced)	IPA	Languages
Voiceless trilled bilabial affricate	[pʙ̥]	Not attested in any natural language.	Voiced trilled bilabial affricate	[bʙ]	Kele and Avava. Reported only in an allophone of [mb] before [o] or [u].
Voiceless trilled alveolar affricate	[tr̥]	Ngkoth.	Voiced trilled alveolar affricate	[dr]	Nias. Fijian and Avava also have this sound after [n].
Voiceless trilled retroflex affricate	[ʈɽ̊]	Baima	Voiced trilled retroflex affricate	[ɖɽ]	Baima
Voiceless epiglottal affricate	[ʡʜ]	Hydaburg Haida.	Voiced epiglottal affricate	[ʡʢ]	Hydaburg Haida. Cognate to Southern Haida [ɢ], Masset Haida [ʕ].

Moré, Oro Win, Sangtam, and Wariʼ have the heterorganic dental-labial /t̪ʙ̥/.

=== Heterorganic affricates ===
Although most affricates are homorganic, some languages have affricate phonemes produced in two separate places of articulation.

- Labial–coronal:
  - Djeoromitxí has /ps bz/.
  - Northern Sotho has /psʰ ᵐpsʰ pʃʼ pʃʰ ᵐpʃʼ ᵐpʃʰ βʒ/.
  - Sotho has /pʃʼ pʃʰ bʒ fʃ/.
- Labial–dorsal:
  - Nganasan has /fx/ in some analyses, though not a modern mainstream view.
- Coronal–labial:
  - Moré and Wariʼ have /t̪ʙ̥/.
  - In Oro Win, /t̪/ is realized as [t̪ʙ̥] before /y/.
  - Sangtam has /t̪ʙ̥ t̪ʙ̥ʰ/.
  - In Phuthi, /ts dz/ are realized as [tf dv] before rounded vowels.
- Coronal–dorsal:
  - In Mescalero-Chiricahua and Navajo, /tʰ/ is typically realized with velar frication [tx].
- Dorsal–labial:
  - In the Efe dialect of Lese, /kp/ has the allophone [kʙ̥].
- Dorsal–coronal:
  - Blackfoot has /ks ksː/.

=== Phonation, coarticulation and other variants ===
The coronal and dorsal places of articulation attested as ejectives as well: [tθʼ, tsʼ, tɬʼ, tʃʼ, tɕʼ, tʂʼ, c𝼆ʼ, kxʼ, k𝼄ʼ, qχʼ]. Several Khoisan languages such as Taa are reported to have voiced ejective affricates, but these are actually pre-voiced: [dtsʼ, dtʃʼ]. Affricates are also commonly aspirated: [ɱp̪fʰ, tθʰ, tsʰ, tɬʰ, tʃʰ, tɕʰ, tʂʰ], murmured: [ɱb̪vʱ, dðʱ, dzʱ, dɮʱ, dʒʱ, dʑʱ, dʐʱ], and prenasalized: [ⁿdz, ⁿtsʰ, ᶯɖʐ, ᶯʈʂʰ] (as in Hmong). Labialized, palatalized, velarized, and pharyngealized affricates are also common. Affricates may also have phonemic length, that is, affected by a chroneme, as in Italian and Karelian.

== Phonological representation ==
In phonology, affricates tend to behave similarly to plosives, taking part in phonological patterns that fricatives do not, e.g. phonemic contrasts:

- Navajo /t ts tʰ tsʰ tʼ tsʼ/ vs. /s z/ (*d *dz *sʰ *sʼ)
- Sanskrit /t tɕ tʰ tɕʰ d dʑ dʱ dʑʱ/ vs. /ɕ/ (*ɕʰ *ʑ *ʑʱ)

There are exceptions, however:

- Basque /t̻ d̻/ vs. /t̻s̻ s̻ t̺s̺ s̺/ (*t̺ *d̺ *dz *z)
- Derung /t s d z/ vs. /ts/ (*dz)
- Djeoromitxí /p/ vs. /ps bz/ (*b *s *z)

Kehrein (2002) analyzes phonetic affricates as phonological stops. A sibilant or lateral (and presumably trilled) stop can be realized phonetically only as an affricate and so might be analyzed phonemically as a sibilant or lateral stop. In that analysis, affricates other than sibilants and laterals are a phonetic mechanism for distinguishing stops at similar places of articulation (like more than one labial, coronal, or dorsal place). For example, Chipewyan has laminal dental [t̪͡θ] vs. apical alveolar [t]; other languages may contrast velar [k] with palatal [c͡ç] and uvular [q͡χ]. Affricates may also be a strategy to increase the phonetic contrast between aspirated or ejective and tenuis consonants.

According to Kehrein (2002), no language contrasts a non-sibilant, non-lateral affricate with a stop at the same place of articulation and with the same phonation and airstream mechanism, such as /t̪/ and /t̪θ/ or /k/ and /kx/.

In feature-based phonology, affricates are distinguished from stops by the feature [+delayed release].

== Affrication ==
Affrication (sometimes called affricatization) is a sound change by which a consonant, usually a stop or fricative, changes into an affricate. Examples include:

- Proto-Germanic /k/ > Modern English /t͡ʃ/, as in chin (cf. German: Kinn: Anglo-Frisian palatalization)
- Proto-Semitic /ɡ/ > Standard Arabic /d͡ʒ/ in all positions, as in جمل /d͡ʒamal/ (jamal) 'camel' (cf. Aramaic: גמלא (gamlā'), Amharic: ግመል (gəmäl), and Hebrew: גמל (gamal)).
- Early Modern English /tj, dj/ > /t͡ʃ, d͡ʒ/ (yod-coalescence)
- /p, t, k/ > /pf, t͡s, kx/ in the High German consonant shift and partially also in Cockney and Scouse
- [t] > [t͡s, t͡ʃ] before [ɯᵝ, i] respectively in 16th-century Japanese
- [r] > [d͡ʒ, d͡ʑ] word-initially in Udmurt
- Polish /tʲ, dʲ/ > /t͡ɕ, d͡ʑ/
- Brazilian Portuguese /t, d/ > [t͡ʃ, d͡ʒ] before /i, ĩ/ in most regions
- Quebec French /t, d/ > [t͡s, d͡z] before /i, y, j, ɥ/ in most regions

== Pre-affrication ==
In rare instances, a fricative–stop contour may occur. This is the case in dialects of Scottish Gaelic that have velar frication [ˣ] where other dialects have pre-aspiration. For example, in the Harris dialect there is seachd [ʃaˣkʰ] 'seven' and ochd [ɔˣkʰ] 'eight' (or [ʃax͜kʰ], [ɔx͜kʰ]). Richard Wiese argues this is the case for word-initial fricative-plosive sequences in German, and coined the term suffricate for such contours. Awngi has 2 suffricates /s͡t/ and /ʃ͡t/ according to some analyses.

== See also ==
- Apical consonant
- Hush consonant
- Laminal consonant
- Index of phonetics articles

== Bibliography ==
- Angenot, Geralda de Lima Vitor (2013-08-23). "FONOTÁTICA E FONOLOGIA DO LEXEMA PROTOCHAPAKURA". Revista Eletrônica Língua Viva (in Brazilian Portuguese). 3 (1) 1: 31–37. ISSN 2237-9800.
- Collins, Beverley; Mees, Inger M. (2003) [First published 1981]. The Phonetics of English and Dutch (5th ed.). Leiden: Brill Publishers. ISBN 9004103406.
- Csúcs, Sándor (2005). Die Rekonstruktion der permischen Grundsprache. Bibliotheca Uralica (in German). Vol. 13. Budapest: Akadémiai Kiadó. p. 139. ISBN 963-05-8184-1.
- Demolin, Didier; Teston, Bernard (September 1997). "Phonetic characteristics of double articulations in some Mangbutu-Efe languages" (PDF). International Speech Communication Association: 803–806.
- Edmondson, Jerold A.; Esling, John H.; Harris, Jimmy G. (2003). Supraglottal cavity shape, linguistic register, and other phonetic features of Somali (PDF) (Report). Archived from the original (PDF) on 2012-03-15.
- Elfner, Emily (2006). "Contrastive Syllabification in Blackfoot" (PDF). Proceedings of the 25th West Coast Conference on Formal Linguistics: 141–149.
- Frantz, Donald G. (1999). "The Sounds of Blackfoot". Lethbridge, Alberta, University of Lethbridge. Archived from the original on 2007-05-23.
- Gimson, Alfred Charles (2014). Cruttenden, Alan (ed.). Gimson's Pronunciation of English (8th ed.). Routledge. p. 172. ISBN 9781444183092.
- Gussmann, Edmund (2007). The Phonology of Polish. Oxford University Press. p. 7. ISBN 978-0-19-926747-7.
- Hayes, Bruce (2009). Introductory Phonology. Blackwell. pp. 79–80. ISBN 978-1-4051-8411-3.
- Hoijer, Harry; Opler, Morris E. (1938). Chiricahua and Mescalero Apache texts. The University of Chicago publications in anthropology; Linguistic series. Chicago: University of Chicago Press. ISBN 9780598942005.
- Howell, Peter; Rosen, Stuart (March 1983). "Production and perception of rise time in the voiceless affricate/fricative distinction". The Journal of the Acoustical Society of America. 73 (3): 976–984. Bibcode:1983ASAJ...73..976H. doi:10.1121/1.389023. ISSN 0001-4966. PMID 6841824.
- Iskarous, Khalil; McDonough, Joyce; Whalen, D. H. (2012-01-25). "A gestural account of the velar fricative in Navajo". Laboratory Phonology. 3 (1): 195–210. doi:10.1515/lp-2012-0011. ISSN 1868-6354. PMC 3994885. PMID 24765216.
- Johnson, Keith (2003). Acoustic and Auditory Phonetics (2nd ed.). Malden, MA: Blackwell Publishing. ISBN 978-1405101233.
- Joswig, Andreas (2010). The Phonology of Awngi (PDF). SIL Electronic Working Papers. SIL International.
- Kehrein, Wolfgang (2002). Phonological representation and phonetic phasing: affricates and laryngeals. Tübingen: De Gruyter. doi:10.1515/9783110911633. ISBN 9783484304666.
- Labov, William (1966). The Social Stratification of English in New York City (PDF) (2nd ed.). Cambridge: Cambridge University Press. pp. 36–37. Archived from the original (PDF) on 2014-08-24.
- Ladefoged, P. (2006). A Course in Phonetics (5th ed.). Wadsworth. ISBN 978-1413006889.
- Ladefoged, Peter; Maddieson, Ian (1996). The Sounds of the World's Languages. Oxford: Blackwell. ISBN 0-631-19815-6.
- Laver, John (1994). Principles of Phonetics. Cambridge Textbooks in Linguistics. Cambridge: Cambridge University Press. p. 374. ISBN 978-0-521-45031-7.
- Maddieson, Ian (1984). Patterns of sounds. Cambridge University Press. ISBN 0-521-26536-3.
- McDonough, Joyce (2003). The Navajo Sound System. Studies in Natural Language and Linguistic Theory. Vol. 55. Dordrecht: Springer Netherlands. doi:10.1007/978-94-010-0207-3. ISBN 978-1-4020-1351-5.
- McDonough, Joyce; Wood, Valerie (July 2008). "The stop contrasts of the Athabaskan languages". Journal of Phonetics. 36 (3): 427–449. doi:10.1016/j.wocn.2007.11.001.
- Miller, Kirk (2024-02-21). "L2/24-051: Unicode request for affricate ligatures" (PDF).
- Ministry of Education of the People's Republic of China (2006). "The Universal Phonetic Symbol Set in China" [中国通用音标符号集] (PDF) (in Chinese). GF 3007-2006.
- Mitani, Shigeki; Kitama, Toshihiro; Sato, Yu (September 2006). "Voiceless affricate/fricative distinction by frication duration and amplitude rise slope". The Journal of the Acoustical Society of America. 120 (3): 1600–1607. Bibcode:2006ASAJ..120.1600M. doi:10.1121/1.2221390. ISSN 0001-4966. PMID 17004482.
- "Blackfoot Pronunciation and Spelling Guide". Native-Languages.org.
- Niesler, Thomas; Louw, Philippa; Roux, Justus (November 2005). "Phonetic analysis of Afrikaans, English, Xhosa and Zulu using South African speech databases". Southern African Linguistics and Applied Language Studies. 23 (4): 459–474. doi:10.2989/16073610509486401. ISSN 1607-3614. S2CID 7138676.
- "Phoible 2.0". Archived from the original on 2021-02-04.
- Pires, Nádia N. (1992). Estudo da gramática da língua Jeoromitxi (Jabuti) (MA thesis). Universidade Estadual de Campinas.
- Roach, Peter (2009). "English Phonetics and Phonology Glossary" (PDF). Archived from the original (PDF) on April 12, 2015.
- Strand, Richard F. (2010). "Nurestâni Languages". Encyclopaedia Iranica, Online Edition. Archived from the original on 2016-11-06.
- Takayama, Tomoaki (2015). "15– Historical Phonology". In Kubozono, Haruo (ed.). Handbook of Japanese Phonetics and Phonology. Walter de Gruyter. pp. 629–630. ISBN 9781614511984. Archived from the original on 2 May 2016.
- Thurgood, Ela; Demenko, Grazyna (January 2001). "Phonetic realizations of Polish geminate affricates". www.researchgate.net. ResearchGate.
- Valenzuela, Pilar M.; Pinedo, Luis Márquez; Maddieson, Ian (2001). "Shipibo". Journal of the International Phonetic Association. 31 (2): 281–285. doi:10.1017/S0025100301002109. Archived from the original on 2021-12-02.
- van der Hulst, Harry; Ritter, Nancy (2012). The Syllable: Views and Facts. De Gruyter. p. 175.
- Warren, Paul; Bauer, Laurie (2004). "Maori English: phonology". In Schneider, Edgar W.; Burridge, Kate; Kortmann, Bernd; Mesthrie, Rajend; Upton, Clive (eds.). A handbook of varieties of English. Vol. 1: Phonology. Mouton de Gruyter. pp. 614–624. ISBN 3-11-017532-0.
- Wells, John C. (1982). Accents of English 2: The British Isles. Cambridge: Cambridge University Press. pp. 322–323, 372. ISBN 0-521-24224-X.
- Wilbur, Joshua (2014). A Grammar of Pite Saami. Berlin: Language Science Press. p. 47. ISBN 978-3-944675-47-3.
- Young, R.; Morgan, W. (1987). The Navajo Language. University of New Mexico Press. ISBN 9780826310149.
- Zamponi, Raoul (1996). "Multiple sources of glottal stop in Raʔivavaean". Oceanic Linguistics. 35 (1): 6–20. doi:10.2307/3623028. JSTOR 3623028.
- Bessell, Nicola J. (1993). "Preliminary Notes on Some Pacific Northwest Coast Pharyngeals" (PDF). Institute for Research in Cognitive Science, University of Pennsylvania.

Place →	Labial					Coronal										Dorsal					Laryngeal			
Manner ↓	Bilabial		Labiodental		Linguolabial		Dental		Alveolar		Postalveolar		Retroflex		(Alveolo-)palatal		Velar		Uvular		Pharyngeal/epiglottal		Glottal	
Nasal	m̥	m	ɱ̊	ɱ		n̼	n̪̊	n̪	n̥	n	n̠̊	n̠	ɳ̊	ɳ	ɲ̊	ɲ	ŋ̊	ŋ	ɴ̥	ɴ				
Plosive	p	b	p̪	b̪	t̼	d̼	t̪	d̪	t	d			ʈ	ɖ	c	ɟ	k	ɡ	q	ɢ	ʡ		ʔ	
Sibilant affricate							t̪s̪	d̪z̪	ts	dz	t̠ʃ	d̠ʒ	tʂ	dʐ	tɕ	dʑ								
Non-sibilant affricate	pɸ	bβ	p̪f	b̪v			t̪θ	d̪ð	tɹ̝̊	dɹ̝	t̠ɹ̠̊˔	d̠ɹ̠˔			cç	ɟʝ	kx	ɡɣ	qχ	ɢʁ	ʡʜ	ʡʢ	ʔh	
Sibilant fricative							s̪	z̪	s	z	ʃ	ʒ	ʂ	ʐ	ɕ	ʑ								
Non-sibilant fricative	ɸ	β	f	v	θ̼	ð̼	θ	ð	θ̠	ð̠	ɹ̠̊˔	ɹ̠˔	ɻ̊˔	ɻ˔	ç	ʝ	x	ɣ	χ	ʁ	ħ	ʕ	h	ɦ
Approximant		β̞		ʋ				ð̞		ɹ		ɹ̠		ɻ		j		ɰ						˷
Tap/flap		ⱱ̟		ⱱ					ɾ̥	ɾ			ɽ̊	ɽ						ɢ̆		ʡ̆		
Trill	ʙ̥	ʙ							r̥	r		r̠	ɽ̊r̥	ɽr					ʀ̥	ʀ	ʜ	ʢ		
Lateral affricate									tɬ	dɮ			tꞎ	d𝼅	c𝼆	ɟʎ̝	k𝼄	ɡʟ̝						
Lateral fricative							ɬ̪		ɬ	ɮ			ꞎ	𝼅	𝼆	ʎ̝	𝼄	ʟ̝						
Lateral approximant								l̪	l̥	l		l̠	ɭ̊	ɭ	ʎ̥	ʎ	ʟ̥	ʟ		ʟ̠				
Lateral tap/flap									ɺ̥	ɺ			𝼈̊	𝼈		ʎ̆		ʟ̆						

		BL	LD	D	A	PA	RF	P	V	U
Implosive	Voiced	ɓ			ɗ		ᶑ	ʄ	ɠ	ʛ
Implosive	Voiceless	ɓ̥			ɗ̥		ᶑ̊	ʄ̊	ɠ̊	ʛ̥
Ejective	Stop	pʼ			tʼ		ʈʼ	cʼ	kʼ	qʼ
Ejective	Affricate		p̪fʼ	tθʼ	tsʼ	tʃʼ	tʂʼ	tɕʼ	kxʼ	qχʼ
Ejective	Fricative	ɸʼ	fʼ	θʼ	sʼ	ʃʼ	ʂʼ	ɕʼ	xʼ	χʼ
Ejective	Lateral affricate				tɬʼ			c𝼆ʼ	k𝼄ʼ	q𝼄ʼ
Ejective	Lateral fricative				ɬʼ					
Click (top: velar; bottom: uvular)	Tenuis	kʘ qʘ		kǀ qǀ	kǃ qǃ		k𝼊 q𝼊	kǂ qǂ		
Click (top: velar; bottom: uvular)	Voiced	ɡʘ ɢʘ		ɡǀ ɢǀ	ɡǃ ɢǃ		ɡ𝼊 ɢ𝼊	ɡǂ ɢǂ		
Click (top: velar; bottom: uvular)	Nasal	ŋʘ ɴʘ		ŋǀ ɴǀ	ŋǃ ɴǃ		ŋ𝼊 ɴ𝼊	ŋǂ ɴǂ	ʞ	
Click (top: velar; bottom: uvular)	Tenuis lateral				kǁ qǁ					
Click (top: velar; bottom: uvular)	Voiced lateral				ɡǁ ɢǁ					
Click (top: velar; bottom: uvular)	Nasal lateral				ŋǁ ɴǁ					
