= Asa language =

Extinct Cushitic language of Tanzania

Asa
- Aasax
- Aasá
- Region: Tanzania
- Ethnicity: Asa
- Extinct: 1952–1956
- Language family: Afro-Asiatic: Cushitic; South; East?; Asa

Language codes
- ISO 639-3: aas
- Glottolog: aasa1238
- ELP: Aasáx
- Aasax is classified as Extinct by the UNESCO World Atlas of Languages

The Asa (Aasá) language, commonly rendered Aasax (also rendered as Aasá, Aasáx, Aramanik, Asak, Asax, Assa, Asá), is an Afroasiatic language formerly spoken by the Asa people of Tanzania. The language is extinct; ethnic Assa in northern Tanzania remember only a few words they overheard their elders use, and none ever used it themselves. Little is known of the language; what is recorded was probably Aasa lexical words used in a register of Maasai, similar to the mixed language Mbugu.

== Classification ==
Asa is usually classified as Cushitic, most closely related to Kw'adza. However, it might have retained a non-Cushitic layer from an earlier language shift.

The Aramanik (Laramanik) people once spoke Asa, but shifted to Nandi (as opposed to Maasai).

== Vocabulary ==
Asa is known from three primary sources: two vocabulary lists from 1904 and 1928, and a collection by W. C. Winter from 1974.

The following are some example words of Asa, together with probable cognates identified in Kw'adza and Iraqw:

- 'big': jira — Kw'adza dire
- 'bird': širaʔa — Iraqw tsʼirʕi
- 'louse': ʔita — Iraqw itirmo
- 'blood': saʔaka — Kw'adza saʔuko
- 'bone': farit — Kw'adza falaʔeto, Iraqw fara
- 'horn': hadoŋ — Kw'adza xalinko, Iraqw xaraŋ
- 'hair': seʔemuk — Iraqw seʔemi
- 'head': sogok — Kw'adza sagiko, Iraqw saga
- 'eye': ilat — Kw'adza ilito, Iraqw ila
- 'mouth': afok — Kw'adza afuko, Iraqw afa
- 'tongue': šeferank — Iraqw tsʼifraŋ
- 'breast': isank — Iraqw isaŋ
- 'heart': monok — Kw'adza munaku, Irawn muna
- 'water': maʔa — Kw'adza maʔaya, Iraqw maʔay
- 'sand': hajat — Kw'adza hasinko, Iraqw hasaŋ
- 'stone': deʔok — Kw'adza tlʼaʔiko, Iraqw tlʼaʕano
- 'to drink': wat- — Kw'adza wat-, Iraqw wah-
- 'to eat': ʔag- — Kw'adza ag-, Iraqw ʕayim-
- 'to lie': ʔat- — Kw'adza kʼat-, Iraqw qat-
- 'to die': ga- — Kw'adza gwaʔ-, Iraqw gwa-
- 'to kill': gas- — Kw'adza gaʔis-, Iraqw gas-
- 'far': sanga — Kw'adza sagumu, Iraqw saw
- 'near': šaya — Kw'adza tsʼahemi, Iraqw tsʼew

Some loanwords in Asa from other languages are known:

- 'three': samak and 'five': mut, from Datooga
- 'dog': kite, from Chaga

== Literature ==
- Ehret, Christopher (1980). The Historical Reconstruction of Southern Cushitic phonology and vocabulary. Kölner Beiträge zur Afrikanistik. Vol. 5. Dietrich Reimer.
- Petrollino, Sara; Mous, Maarten (2010). "Recollecting Words and Expressions in Aasá, a Dead Language in Tanzania". Anthropological Linguistics. 52 (2): 206–216. doi:10.1353/anl.2010.0012.
- Winter, Christopher (1979). "Language Shift among the Aasáx, a Hunter-Gatherer Tribe in Tanzania". Sprache und Geschichte in Afrika. 1: 175–204.
