= L with double bar =

Latin letter

- Ⱡ ⱡ

Usage
- Writing system: Latin script
- Type: alphabetic
- Language of origin: Kutenai language, Nii language, Melpa language, Wahgi language
- Sound values: [ʟ]; [ʟ̝]; [gʟ̝]; [𝼄]; [ɬ]
- In Unicode: U+2C60, U+2C61

History
Development
U20
  S39
          - Λ λ
            - 𐌋
              - L l
                - Ⱡ ⱡ

L with double bar (Ⱡ ⱡ) is an additional letter used in the writing of the Kutenai language in Canada and some Chimbu–Wahgi languages like the Melpa and Nii languages in Papua New Guinea, composed of an L with two horizontal bars.

== Usage ==
Ⱡ is used in Kutenai to represent the voiceless alveolar lateral fricative [ɬ]. In practical usage, it is commonly replaced with the doubly barred vertical pipe ⟨ǂ⟩.

Ⱡ was initially used as an alternative to belted l ⟨ɬ⟩, mostly in handwriting and was preferred by Kutenai-language teachers in the 1990s.

Ⱡ is used in Melpa and Nii to represent a velar lateral [ʟ] or [𝼄].

Ⱡ replaced l with bar ⟨ƚ⟩ in Nii from 1980-1990s.

== Computing codes ==
L with double bar can be represented with the following Unicode characters:

Character information
Preview	Ⱡ		ⱡ	
Unicode name	LATIN CAPITAL LETTER L WITH DOUBLE BAR		LATIN SMALL LETTER L WITH DOUBLE BAR	
Encodings	decimal	hex	dec	hex
Unicode	11360	U+2C60	11361	U+2C61
UTF-8	226 177 160	E2 B1 A0	226 177 161	E2 B1 A1
Numeric character reference	&#11360;	&#x2C60;	&#11361;	&#x2C61;

== See also ==
- Bar (diacritic)

== Bibliography ==
- "Ktunaxa Alphabet". FirstVoices.com. FirstVoices.com-Ktunaxa.
- Morgan, Lawrence (1991). A description of the Kutenai language. University of California at Berkeley.
- Priest, Lorna A. (2004). Revised Proposal to Encode Additional Latin Orthographic Characters (PDF).
- Ktunaxa Pronunciation - Quick Guide (PDF). ʔaq̓amnik̓ Elementary School. 2020.
