= Dom language =

Chimbu language spoken in Papua New Guinea

Dom
- Dom [^{n}dom˩˥]
- Native to: Papua New Guinea
- Region: Gumine District and Sinasina District of the Simbu Province
- Native speakers: 16,000 (2006)
- Language family: Trans–New Guinea: Chimbu–Wahgi; Chimbu; Eastern; Dom
- Dialects: Era; Non Ku; Ilai Ku

Language codes
- ISO 639-3: doa
- Glottolog: domm1246

Dom is a Trans–New Guinea language of the Eastern Group of the Chimbu family, spoken in the Gumine and Sinasina Districts of Chimbu Province and in some other isolated settlements in the western highlands of Papua New Guinea.

== Sociolinguistic Background ==
The Dom people live in an agricultural society, which has a tribal, patrilocal and patrilineal organization. There is only small dialectal differentiation among the clans. The predominant religion is Christianity.

== Language Contact Situation ==
There are three different languages spoken by Dom speakers alongside Dom: Tok Pisin, Kuman and English. Tok Pisin serves as the Papuan lingua franca. Kuman, which is a closely related eastern Chimbu language of high social and cultural prestige, functions as the prestige language used in ceremonies and official situations. School lessons are mostly held in English.

== Phonology ==
=== Vowels ===
Vowels
	Front	Back
Close	i	u
Mid	e	o
Open	a aː	

==== Minimal pairs ====
e~i	˦de 'faeces'~˦di 'axe'
o~u	˦kol 'part~˦kul 'grass'
e~o~a	˥˩pel 'to dig'~˥˩pol 'to pull out'~˥˩pal 'to skin'
a~a:	˥˩bna 'brother'~˥˩bna: 'frame over the fireplace'

==== Allophones ====
Vowel lengthening in a contour pitched syllable has allophonic character.

Vowels	default realisation	contour pitched syllable	word final	special context
e	[e]~[ɛ]	[e:]	[ə],Ø	#C_#
i	[i]	[i:]	[i]	[i]
o	[o]~[ɔ]	[o:]~[oɔ]	[o]	[o]
u	[u]	[u:]	[u]	[u]
a	[a]	[a:]	[a]	[a]

==== Vowel Sequences ====
iu,io,ia uo

eu,ei,ea o

au,ai,ae a:

=== Consonants ===
The Dom consonant system consists of 13 indigenous and 3 loan consonants.

		bilabial	alveolar	alveopalatal	velar
nasals		m	n		
plosive/ affricate	voiceless	p	t	(ts~tʃ ⟨c⟩) (Note: The three loan phonemes are unstable to a varying degree.)	k
plosive/ affricate	prenasalized + voiced	ᵐb	ⁿd	(ⁿdʒ ⟨j⟩)	ᵑg
fricative			s		
lateral			l		(ʟ)
flap			ɾ		
approximant		w		j ⟨y⟩	

==== Minimal pairs ====
˩˥su 'two' ~ ˩˥tu 'thick'

~ ˩˥du 'squeeze'
~ ˩˥nu 'aim at'
~ ˩˥ku 'hold in the mouth'
~ ˩˥gu 'shave'
~ ˩˥pu 'blow'
~ ˩˥mu 'his/her back'
~ ˩˥yu 'harvest taro'

==== Allophones ====
	/p/	/t/	/k/	/b/	/<d/	/g/	/m/	/n/	(/c/)	(/j/)	/s/	/l/	/(ʟ)/	/r/	/w/	/y/
default realization	[p]	[t]	[k]	[ᵐb]	[ⁿd]	[ŋg]	[m]	[n]	([tʃ])	([ⁿdʒ])	[s]	[l]	([ʟ])	[ɾ]	[w]	[j]
free alternation										([d(i)])	[ts], [tʃ]		([k] [ʟ̥] [k͡ʟ̥])	[r], [n], [l]		
#_	[pp]	[t],[tt]	[kk]	[b],[bb]	[d],[dd]	[g],[gg]	[m]	[n]	[tʃ]	[j],[jj]	[s],[ʃ]	Ø	Ø	([ɾ])	Ø	Ø
V_V	[β]	([t])	[ɣ]			[ŋ], [ŋg]					[s], [ʃ]	([l])				
other contexts					[ɖ]			[ɳ]			[ʃ]	[ʟ]	[t^]/[d^]	Ø		

Variants can be determined by the factors of dialect or age. Certain exceptions show archaic variants, for example the existence of intervocal [b] in the word ˥˩iba 'but' or the otherwise non-existent sequence [lk], which is used only by elderly people or in official situations. Brackets "()" show, that the allophone is used only in loanwords.

== Tones ==
Dom is a tonal language. Each word carries one of three tones as shown in the examples below:

- high:
  - ka˥ 'word'
  - mu˥kal˥ 'a kind of bamboo'
  - no˥ma˥ne˥ 'to think'
- falling:
  - ^{ŋ}gal˥˩ 'string back'
  - jo˥pa˩ ' yopa tree', jo˥pal˥˩ 'people'
  - a˥ra˥wa˩ 'pumpkin'
- rising:
  - kal˩˥ 'thing'
  - a˩pal˧ 'woman'
  - au˩pa˩le˧ 'sister.3SG.POSS'

=== Minimal pairs ===
wam˥˩ (personal name) ~ wam˩ 'to hitch.3SG' ~ wam˥ 'son.3SG.POSS'

=== Non-phonemic Elements ===
- [ɨ] is optionally inserted between consonants:

˥˩komna 'vegetable' kom˥ na˩ or kom˥ ɨ na˩

== Morphology ==
Dom is a suffixing language. Morpheme boundaries between person-number and mood morphemes can be combined.

== Syntax ==
=== Phrase Structure ===
Noun Phrase

attributive noun phrases possessor marker relative clause noun classifier	head noun	numerals adjectives appositions	demonstratives

- elements preceding the head:

- attributive NP

yal i kal
man DEM thing
'the thing of the man'

- possessive marker

na bola-n
I pig-2SG.POSS
'My pig'

- relative clause

o pal bin-gwa kal
hand.3SG.POSS by produce-3SG.SRD thing
'thing produced by hand'

- noun classifier

bola sipsip
pig sheep
'sheep'

- elements following the head:

- numerals

yal su
man two
'two men'

- adjectives

gal bl
child big
'big child'

- appositions

ge apal gal
girl woman child
'girl, female child'

- demonstratives

yal i
man DEM
'this man'

If a noun phrase includes a demonstrative element, it has always the last position of the phrase:

yal su i
man two DEM
'the two men'

Adjective Phrase

head adjective	intensifier

er wai won ta
tree good truly a
'a very good tree'

Postpositional Phrase

noun	head postposition

m-na bol
mother-1SG.POSS with
'with my mother'

Verbal Phrase

subject (object)	object (subject)	adverbials conditional adverbial clauses final adverbial clauses	head verb	AUX mutual knowledge marker enclitics	demonstratives

- elements preceding the head verb:

- subject:

yal su al-ipke
man two {stand up-2/3DU.IND}
'two men stand up'

- subject-object:

na keepa ne-ke
1.EXCL sweet.potato eat-1SG.IND
'I eat a sweet potato'

- adverbial

orpl-d u-o
quickly come-2SG.IMP
'come quickly'

- final clause

er ila na-l d u-ke
to inside go-1SG.FUT Q come-1SG.IND
'I came to go inside'

- elements following the head verb:

- auxiliars:

bl-n de bla d-na-wdae
head-2SG.POSS burn.INF burst (say)-FUT-3SG.MUT
'Your head will be burnt and explode (as a matter of course)'

- mutual knowledge marker

mol-me =krae
stay-1SG.IND =MUT
'he/she stay as we know'

- demonstratives

yo-gwa ime
be-3SG.IND down.there
'There it is down over there'

There are no zero-place predicates in Dom. As a subject ˩˥kamn 'world' is used:

˩˥kamn ˥˩su-gwe
rain hit-3SG.IND
'It rains'

=== Constituent Order ===
The predominant constituent order is SOV. Only the predicate has to be expressed overtly. An exception are absolute-topic type clauses, which consist only of one noun phrase.

==== Characteristics of the constituent order ====
- Three Place Predicate Order

In the case of a three place predicate the recipient noun always follows the gift noun:

˥Ella ˩˥Naur ˥˩moni ˥na ˥˩te-na-m=˥˩ua
tribe.name tribe.name money 1.EXCL give-FUT-3SG=ENC.WA
Noun adjunct Gift Recipient V
'The Naur subtribe of the Ella tribe shall give me money.'

The only position which can be optionally filled is the sentence topic. Possible constituents can be the subject of an equational sentence (default), an extrasentential or a topicalized constituent:

- subject in an equational sentence (default)

subject	object	verb

˩˥apal ˩˥su ˥˩i ˥na ˥˩ep-na
woman two DEM 1.EXCL wife
'These two women are my wives'

- extrasentential:

extrasentential	subject	verb

˩˥apal ˩˥su ˥˩i ˥na ˥˩ep-na ˩˥mo-ip-ke
woman two DEM 1.EXCL wife-1SG.POSS stay-2/3DU-IND
'As for these two women, they are my wives'

- topicalized constituent:

object (topicalzied)	subject	verb

˩˥apal ˩˥su ˥˩i ˥na ˥i ˩˥war-ke
woman two DEM 1.EXCL take.INF move.around-1SG.IND
'As for these two women, I have them as spouses'

=== Marking of Syntactical Relations ===
==== Person and Number ====
Dom has three different person-number-systems: for pronouns, possessive suffixes on nouns and cross reference markers on verbs.

person-number system for pronouns:
	1	2
general (excl)	˥na	˥en
non-singular (excl)	˥no	˥en
non-singular(incl)	˩˥none	˥en
non-singular	˥ne	˥en

person-number system for possessive suffixes:
	1	2	3
singular	-na	-n	-m
non-singular	-ne		

cross reference markers:
	1	2	3
singular	-i~-Ø	-n	-m
dual	-pl	-ipl	
plural(three or more)	-pn	-im	

The marking of dual and plural is not obligatory in all cases but depends on the sem ±human ±animate:

	+human	-human
+animate	almost obligatory	optional/uncommon
-animate	Ø	scarcely used

==== Tense ====
Dom has an unmarked non-future tense and a marked future tense.

===== Non-Future =====
Non-future tense is used, if

- the event follows immediately
- the event is in the past

˥ere ˥˩e-ke
to go-1SG.IND
'I go/I went'

===== Future tense =====
Future tense is marked by the suffix -na (-na~-ra~-a) and is used, if

- the event is part of the speaker's plan for the next day
- the event is the speaker's intention and it is possible for the speaker to go through with it
- the event describes a potentiality or a permanent quality

˥ere ˥˩na-ke
to go.FUT-1SG.IND
'I will go'
'I think I will go'
'I might go’
'I am the kind of person, who goes'

=== Negation ===
A predicate is negated by the suffix -kl. The preceding negation particle ˥ta is optional.

˥na ˥˩kurl ˥ta ˥go +˩˥k -pge
1.EXCL fear NEG die NEG 1PL.IND
'We (excl.) did not fear'

== Lexic ==
=== Noun Classifiers ===
Noun classifiers are lexical items preceding a noun with a more specified meaning. Phonetically and syntactically they form one unit with the following noun and thus differ from an apposition, which consists of two or more phonetic constituents. Noun classifiers can have the following functions:

- no obvious lexical specification:

˥˩nl ˥nul
water river
'river'

- specifying a polysemoous word:

˥ere ˥˩aml
tree peanut/pandanus
'pandanus which bears the nut-like fruit'

˥kul ˥˩aml
grass peanut/pandanus
'peanut'

- explaining loanwords:

˥˩nl ˥˩bia
water alcohol
'Alkohol'

˥˩bola ˥˩sipsip
pig sheep
'sheep'

=== Repetition ===
A noun can be repeated to express the following relations:

- reciprocity

˥˩birua ˥˩birua ˩˥me-ipka
enemy enemy stay-2/3.SRD
'The two are enemies for each other'

- plurality

˥˩kal ˥˩kal
thing thing
'several things'

=== Loanwords ===
Tok Pisin is the main source for lexical borrowing, borrowings from English are often made indirectly via Tok Pisin. Borrowed lexemes mostly refer to new cultural objects and concepts as well as proper names and high numbers., which did not exist in the Dom language before:

- kar ’car’
- skul 'school, to study'
- akn 'Mount Hagen'
- andret 'hundred'

But recently some already existing Dom words have begun to be replaced by Tok Pisin lexical items:

- wanpla for dom tenanta 'one'
- blat for dom miam 'blood'
- stori for dom kapore-el- 'to tell a story'

== The Demonstrative System ==
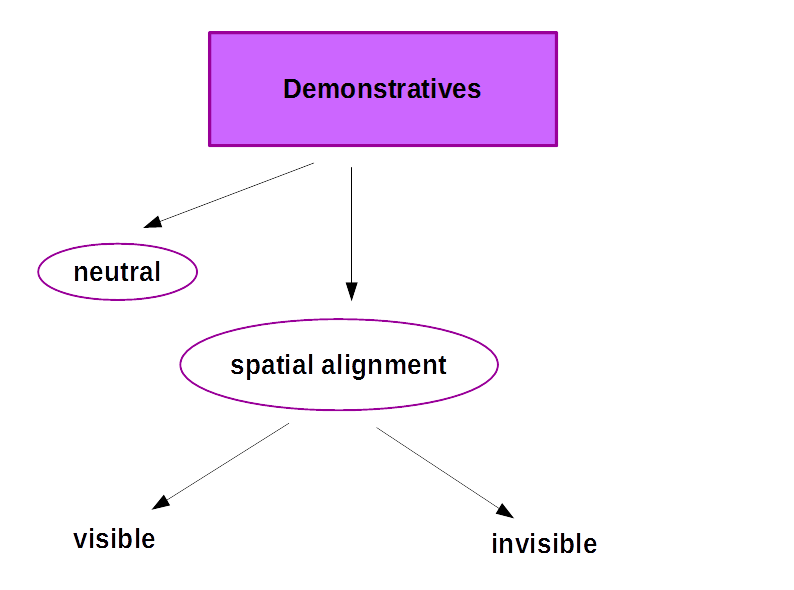
The demonstrative system: spatial alignment and visibility

Dom has a spatial referencing demonstrative system, i.e. there are certain demonstrative lexemes bearing information about the spatial relation of the referred object to the speaker alongside neutral demonstratives. A Dom speaker also uses different lexemes for visible and invisible objects. In the case of visible objects, the speaker locates it on a horizontal and vertical axis as to whether it is proximal, medium or distal from the speaker and on the same level, uphill or downhill.

Demonstratives with spatial alignment:

	proximal	medium	distal
without vertical alignment	˥ya	˥˩sipi	
level	˥yale	˥˩ile	˩˥ile
uphill	˥yape	˥˩ipe	˩˥ipe
downhill	˥yame	˥˩ime	˩˥ime

For invisible objects one must be aware of the cause for its invisibility. If it is invisible because the object is behind the speaker, a proximal demonstrative is used. Objects obscured behind an obstacle are referred to with distal demonstratives and invisible objects by their nature with downhill demonstratives. Invisible objects, that are very far away, are referred to with the downhill distal demonstrative ˩˥ime.
