= Morkai =

Tribe in Papua New Guinea

Morkai is a tribe that lives in the Jimi District of Jiwaka Province, Papua New Guinea. The tribe is subdivided into the smaller clans: Kimbaka, Keska, Galeboka, Maika, Nipka and Parka. The Tabibuga Station stands on Galeboka's and Kimbaka's land mass.

The Morkai tribe speaks the Narak language. There is no intermarriage between the Kimbaka - Keska and Galeboka clans, but there is marriage between the rest of the clans.

The normal livelihood of Morkai is subsistence agriculture. Their main staple food is kaukau (sweet potato), with other seasonal food such as taro, yams and cassavas. Mareta (red panda-nut) is a popular cash crop and is also mainly used for exchanges and bride price gifts.

Pigs are a wide form of livestock wealth. Pigs are also traded for cash or used in exchange for compensation payments and bride price payments. Also pigs are slaughtered for ceremonial activities.
