= Golin language =

Chimbu language spoken in Papua New Guinea

Golin
- Region: Gumine District, Simbu Province
- Native speakers: (50,000 cited 1981)
- Language family: Trans–New Guinea: Chimbu–Wahgi; Chimbu; Golin
- Writing system: Latin

Language codes
- ISO 639-3: gvf
- Glottolog: goli1247

Golin (also Gollum, Gumine) is a Papuan language of Papua New Guinea.

== Phonology ==
=== Vowels ===
	Front	Back
High	ɪ ɪː	ʊ ʊː
Mid	ɛ ɛː	ɔ ɔː
Low		ɑ ɑː

Diphthongs that occur are /ɑi ɑu ɔi ui/. The consonants /l n/ can also be syllabic.

=== Consonant ===
		Bilabial		Alveolar		Palatal	Velar	
		plain	lab.	plain	Late.	Palatal	plain	lab.
Nasal		m		n				
Stop	voiceless /voiced	p b	(bʷ)	t d			k ɡ	(gʷ)
Fricative				s~ʃ	ɬ~ l			
Approximant					ɬ~ l	j		w
Trill				r				

/bʷ ɡʷ/ are treated as single consonants by Bunn & Bunn (1970), but as combinations of /b/ + /w/, /ɡ/ + /w/ by Evans et al. (2005).

Two consonants appear to allow free variation in their realisations: [s] varies with [ʃ], and [l] with [ɬ].

/n/ assimilates to [ŋ] before /k/ and /ɡ/.

=== Tone ===
Golin is a tonal language, distinguishing high ([˧˥]), mid ([˨˧]), and low ([˨˩]) tone. The high tone is marked by an acute accent and the low tone by a grave accent, while the mid tone is left unmarked. Examples:

- High: mú [mu˧˥] 'type of snake'; wí [wi˧˥] 'scream (man)'
- Mid: mu [mu˨˧] 'type of bamboo'; wi [wi˨˧] 'coming from the same ethnic group'
- Low: mù [mu˨˩] 'sound of river'; wì [wi˨˩] 'cut (verb)'

== Pronouns ==
Golin is notable for having a small pronominal paradigm. There are two basic pronouns:

- ná first person
- í second person

There is no number distinction and no true third person pronoun. Third person pronouns in Golin are in fact compounds derived from 'man' plus inín 'self':

- yalíni 'he' < yál 'man' + inín 'self'
- abalíni 'she' < abál 'woman' + inín 'self'
