= Turned L =

Latin letter variant

- Ꞁ ꞁ

Usage
- Writing system: Latin script
- Type: alphabetic
- Language of origin: Cornish language
- Sound values: [ɬ]

History
Development
U20
  S39
          - Λ λ
            - 𐌋
              - L l
                - Ꞁ ꞁ
- Time period: 1790, 1922

Turned L (Ꞁ ꞁ) is an additional letter which was used in medieval Welsh and in certain phonetic transcriptions used in German dialectology. Its capital form is also homoglyphic with the letter reversed ge.

== Usage ==
Turned L is used by William Pryce in his Cornish grammar Archæologia Cornu-Britannica published in 1790. It represents the voiceless alveolar lateral fricative /ɬ/ used in Welsh. In this work, Pryce also used the additional letters turned A ⟨Ɐ ɐ⟩, Chi ⟨Χ χ⟩, Insular D ⟨Ꝺ ꝺ⟩, Insular G ⟨Ᵹ ᵹ⟩, turned Insular G ⟨Ꝿ ꝿ⟩, and Insular T ⟨Ꞇ ꞇ⟩.

In German dialectology, in 1922, Walter Steinhauser uses turned l ⟨ꞁ⟩ to represent middle Bavarian l (donaubairische l), a palatal consonant.

== Forms and variants ==
Form with the lowercase under the baseline.

Form with the lowercase above the baseline.

== Computing codes ==
Turned L can be represented with the following Unicode characters (Latin Extended-D):

Character information
Preview	Ꞁ		ꞁ	
Unicode name	LATIN CAPITAL LETTER TURNED L		LATIN SMALL LETTER TURNED L	
Encodings	decimal	hex	dec	hex
Unicode	42880	U+A780	42881	U+A781
UTF-8	234 158 128	EA 9E 80	234 158 129	EA 9E 81
Numeric character reference	&#42880;	&#xA780;	&#42881;	&#xA781;

== See also ==
- Reversed ge

== Notes and references ==
=== Bibliography ===
- Everson, Michael (2006). Proposal to add Latin letters and a Greek symbol to the UCS (PDF).
- Heepe, Martin (1928). Lautzeichen und ihre Anwendung in verschiedenen Sprachgebieten (in German). Berlin: Reichsdruckerei.
- Pryce, William (1790). Archæologia Cornu-Britannica, or, an Essay to Preserve the Ancient Cornish Language. Sherborne: W. Cruttwell.
- Steinhauser, Walter (1922). Beiträge zur Kunde der bairisch-österreichischen Mundarten, herausgegeben von der Wörterbuch Kommission der Akademie. II. Heft: 1. Textproben. 2. Wortkundliches (in German). Vienne: Hölder-Pichler-Tempsky.
