= Ganja language =

The Ganja language may be:

- Balanta-Ganja language
- Kandawo language
