= Waymadda =

Scientific classification
- Kingdom: Animalia
- Phylum: Arthropoda
- Subphylum: Chelicerata
- Class: Arachnida
- Order: Araneae
- Infraorder: Araneomorphae
- Family: Salticidae
- Genus: Waymadda; Szűts, Zhang, Gallé-Szpisjak & De Bakker, 2020

Type species
- W. enduwa Szűts, Zhang, Gallé-Szpisjak & De Bakker, 2020

Species
- 2, see text

Genus of spiders

Waymadda is a genus of spiders in the family Salticidae (jumping spiders).

== Distribution ==
The genus Waymadda is endemic to Papua New Guinea.

== Etymology ==
The genus name honors arachnologist Wayne Maddison. W. enduwa is named after Enduwa Kombuglu, the local Kuman name of Mount Wilhelm’s peak.

== Species ==
As of January 2026, this genus includes two species:

- Waymadda enduwa Szűts, Zhang, Gallé-Szpisjak & De Bakker, 2020 – Papua New Guinea
- Waymadda rufa (Maddison, 2009) – Papua New Guinea
