= Maring language =

Jimi language spoken in Papua New Guinea

Maring
- Mareng, Yoadabe-Watoare
- Native to: Papua New Guinea
- Region: Madang Province and Western Highlands Province
- Ethnicity: Maring, such as the Tsembaga Maring
- Native speakers: (11,000 cited 1998)
- Language family: Trans–New Guinea: Chimbu–Wahgi; Jimi; Maring
- Dialects: Central Maring; Eastern Maring; Timbunki; Tsuwenki; Karamba; Kambegl

Language codes
- ISO 639-3: mbw
- Glottolog: mari1435
- ELP: Maring

Maring, also known as Mareng or Yoadabe-Watoare, is a Trans–New Guinea language of the Chimbu–Wahgi branch. Speakers of the language can be found in the Bismarck range of the Madang province or in the Hagen district of the Western Highlands province. Dialects of the Maring language are Central Maring, Eastern Maring, Timbunki, Tsuwenki, Karamba, and Kambegl. All Maring speakers can understand the Central Maring dialect.

== Language status and development ==
According to EGIDS, the Expanded Graded Intergenerational Disruption Scale, the Maring language is rated as a 5. This rating on EGIDS means that this language is still developing, meaning that the language is not sustainable but there is significant use of the language verbally and literately. According to AES, the Agglomerated Endangerment Status, the Maring language is considered as threatened.

The development of the language is low. The literacy rate of native speakers is below 5%, while the rate of people who use Maring as a second language is below 5%.

== Phonology ==
Phonemic and Orthographic Inventory
ɑ	^{m}b	^{n}d	ə	ɛ	^{ŋ}g	i	^{n}dz^{j}	k	l	m	n	n^{j}	ŋ	o	p	r	ts^{j}	t	u	w	j
a	b	d	e	ee	g	i	j	k	l	m	n	ny	ng	o	p	r	s	t	u	w	y
A	B	D			G		J	K	L	M	N	Ny	Ng		P	R	S	T		W	Y

/w/ voiced labial-velar approximant

/^{m}b/ voiced prenasalised bilabial plosive

/^{n}d/ voiced prenasalised dental plosive

/^{ŋ}g/ voiced prenasalised velar plosive

/n^{j}/ voiced palatalized dental affricate

/ts^{j}/ voiceless palatalized dental affricate

/^{n}dz^{j}/ voiced prenasalized dental affricate

Maring Consonants
	Bilabial	Dental	Alveolar	Postalveolar	Palatal	Velar
Plosive	p	t				k
Nasal	m	n				ɲ
Trill		r				
Tap or Flap						
Fricative						
Lateral Fricative						
Approximant					j	
Lateral Approximant		l				

Maring Vowels
	Front	Central	Back
Close	i		u
Close-mid		ə	o
Open-mid	ɛ		
Open			ɑ

=== Syllable patterns ===
The following are different patterns of consonants (C) and vowels (V) for syllables. Examples for each pattern show the Maring word with each syllable separated by a period. The example syllable pattern in the word will be in bold. The English translation of the word will follow in single quotation.

==== V ====
- **a**.sa 'sister'
- ai.**u.**gui 'to close'
- au.**a** 'different'

==== VV ====
- **ae** 'we two'
- **ai**.re 'what, how'

==== VC ====
- **am** 'breast'
- **an**.pek 'quickly'
- ai.**uk** 'flat'

==== CV ====
- **ma** 'possum'
- **na**.ko 'I'
- ro.**ba**.da 'hot'
- a.**bo** 'buttocks'

==== CVV ====
- **moe** 'yam type'
- **mai**.wa 'very large'
- jee.**kai** 'grub type'

==== CVC ====
- **kong** 'taro'
- **kam**.gul 'thunder'
- tu.**wum**.pai 'pandanus sp.'
- a.**bin** 'your wife'

==== CVVC ====
- **mieng** 'tree sp.'
- a.**ruib** 'taro type'
