= Salt-Yui language =

Trans–New Guinea language

Salt
- Yui
- Native to: Papua New Guinea
- Region: Chimbu Province
- Native speakers: (6,500 cited 1981)
- Language family: Trans–New Guinea: Chimbu–Wahgi; Chimbu; Salt

Language codes
- ISO 639-3: sll
- Glottolog: salt1242

Salt, or Yui, is a Trans–New Guinea language of Chimbu Province, Papua New Guinea.

== Basics ==
The following are some basic examples of phrases and nouns in Salt-Yui:

Basic examples of Phrases
Salt-Yui	English translation or meaning
yahuno	Basic greeting
ere po	Basic farewell
na hana ___	my name is ___
na pimgi	i understand
ni han dalo	tell me your name
akio	don't touch this

Basic examples of nouns
Salt-Yui	English translation or meaning
gànbá	ground
kuŕìá	magic
há	language
hóng	prayer
daang	slope
owó	yes

== Pronunciation ==
=== Vowels ===
The following is how you pronounce certain vowels in Salt-Yui:

- /a/ is pronounced as in father
- /e/ is pronounced as in peg
- /i/ is pronounced as in tin
- /o/ is pronounced as in more
- /u/ is pronounced as in put

=== Consonants ===
Most consonants are similar to English, except for the following:

- r between vowels is flapped i.e. like 'd'. And if placed at the end of a word it is not voiced but trilled.
- l between vowels is flapped i.e. like 'd'. but if not, it has the same friction as the English 'l'.
- ng is normally pronounced as in 'sing', but if it is in the 2nd person it should be pronounced as a sequence of 'n+g'

== Pronouns ==
=== Possessive Pronouns ===
Most nouns may show ownership this way:

Possessive Pronouns
	1st Person	2nd Person	3rd Person
Singular	-na	-ni	-ng
Plural	-na	-ni	-ng

Example:

Singular Possessive Pronouns with noun 'wa'
Noun	1st Person	2nd Person	3rd Person
wa (son)	wana (my son)	wani (your son)	wang (his/her son)

Plural Possessive Pronouns with noun 'wa'
Noun	1st Person	2nd Person	3rd Person
wa (son)	wana (our son)	wani (your son)	wang (their son)

=== Personal Pronouns ===
Personal pronouns are shown like this:

Personal Pronouns
	1st Person	2nd Person	3rd Person
Singular	na (I)	ni (You)	yali (He/She/It)
Plural	na (We)	ni (?) (You)	yali (?) (Them)

== Verbs ==
The following is how to conjugate verbs with personal pronouns shown with an example:

Conjugation verb 'di' (To say)
	1st Person (Alone)	1st Person	2nd Person	3rd Person
Singular	digi (I alone say)	dimgi (I say)	dingi (you say)	dungwi (he/her/it says)
Plural	X	dimgi (we say)	dingi (you all say)	dungwi (they say)

Conjugation verb 'di' (To say) with modal verb
	1st Person (Alone)	1st Person	2nd Person	3rd Person
Singular	diralgi (I alone shall say)	dinamgi (I shall say)	dinangi (you will say)	dinangwi (he/she/it will say)
Plural	X	dinamgi (we shall say)	dinangi (you all will say)	dinangwi (they will say)

Conjugation verb 'di' (To say) with an auxiliary verb and a negative inflectional suffix
	1st Person (Alone)	1st Person	2nd Person	3rd Person
Singular	dikigi (I alone didn't say)	dikimgi (I didn't say)	dikingi (you didn't say)	dikungw(i/o) (he/her/it didn't say)
Plural	X	dikimgi (we didn't say)	dikingi (you all didn't say)	dikungw(i/o) (they didn't say)

Conjugation verb 'di' (To say) as Interrogative sentence with auxiliary verb
	1st Person (Alone)	1st Person	2nd Person	3rd Person
Singular	dilo (Did i alone say?)	dimno (Did i say?)	dino (Did you say?)	dimo (Did he/she/it say?)
Plural	X	dimno (Did we say?)	dino (Did you all say?)	dimo (Did they say?)

As seen above, Salt-Yui has a special form for verbs with 'I alone'; why this is is still unknown.

Other example verbs:

Example Verbs
Salt-Yui	English
di/du	to be (inanimate)
mol	to be (animate)
ol	to do
ke pai	to live
ne/no	to eat/to drink
te/to	to give

All of these verbs can follow the previous conjugations for verbs.

== Adjectives ==
In Salt-Yui, adjectives usually follow the noun, here are some examples of adjectives in Salt-Yui:

Example Adjectives
Salt-Yui	English
migiga	small
obilga	small amount
miki	many
nol	red/pink
mori	blue/green
pege	white

=== Numerals ===
There are five cardinal numerals that have been written down, which are the following:

Cardinal Numbers
Salt-Yui	English
taniga	one
sutani	two
suitai dire	three
sui sui dire	four
ana holulu	five

=== Locatives ===
The following are examples of known locatives in Salt-Yui:

Locatives
Salt-Yui	English
yolbi	down
manala	under
mibi	above
ala	in
mala	near
bina	beside, edge
