= Natural class =

Concept in linguistics

In phonology, a natural class is a set of phonemes in a language that share certain distinctive features. A natural class is determined by participation in shared phonological processes, described using the minimum number of features necessary for descriptive adequacy.

== Overview ==
Classes are defined by distinctive features having reference to articulatory and acoustic phonetic properties, including manners of articulation, places of articulation, voicing, and continuance. For example, the set containing the sounds /p/, /t/, and /k/ is a natural class of voiceless stops in American Standard English. This class is one of several other classes, including the voiced stops (/b/, /d/, and /g/), voiceless fricatives (/f/, /θ/, /s/, /ʃ/, and /h/), sonorants, and vowels.

To give a further example, the system of Chomsky and Halle defines the class of voiceless stops by the specification of two binary features: [−continuant] and [−voice]. Any sound with both the feature [−continuant] (not able to be pronounced continuously) and the feature [−voice] (not pronounced with vibration of the vocal cords) is included in the class, thus specifying all and only the voiceless stops.

By implication, the class is also described as not having the features [+continuant] or [+voice]. This means that all sounds with either the feature [+continuant] (able to be lengthened in pronunciation) or [+voice] (pronounced with vibration of the vocal cords) are excluded from the class. This excludes all natural classes of sounds besides voiceless stops. For instance, it excludes voiceless fricatives, which have the feature [+continuant], voiced stops, which have the feature [+voice], and voiced approximants and vowels, which have the features [+continuant] and [+voice].

Voiceless stops also have other, redundant, features, such as [+consonantal] and [−lateral]. These are not relevant to the description of the class and are unnecessary, since the features [−continuant] and [−voice] already include all voiceless stops and exclude all other sounds.

It is expected that members of a natural class will behave similarly in the same phonetic environment, and will have a similar effect on sounds that occur in their environment.
