= Evelyn Ramsey =

American missionary and linguist (1923–1989)

Evelyn Mae Ramsey (June 16, 1923 – June 25, 1989) was an American medical missionary and linguist associated with the Church of the Nazarene.

== Biography ==
Ramsey was born in Richmond, Kentucky, June 16, 1923. She took her education at Trevecca Nazarene College, Eastern Nazarene College, Vanderbilt University, and Tufts University School of Medicine. She served at the Raleigh Fitkin Nazarene Hospital in Manzini, Swaziland from 1956 until 1968. In 1969 she was transferred to Papua New Guinea to work at the Nazarene Hospital in Kudjip. Ramsey had always been interested in linguistics, having studied French, Greek, Hebrew, and German and further learned Zulu and Swazi in Africa. In Kudjip she took an interest in the Middle Wahgi language, which was as yet unrecorded; she eventually compiled a dictionary of the language. She also put together a concordance of the New Testament and the Psalms in Pidgin English. Ramsey retired to Indianapolis in 1988, dying there the following year. The dictionary had been published in 1975. Another book, Show Me, Lord, was published in 1982. Ramsey was also the subject of a book, The Ramsey Covenant by L. David Duff, published in 1985.
