= Nii language =

Trans–New Guinea language of Papua New Guinea

Nii
- Ek Nii
- Native to: Papua New Guinea
- Region: Western Highlands Province
- Native speakers: (12,000 cited 1991)
- Language family: Trans–New Guinea: Chimbu–Wahgi; Wahgi; Nii

Language codes
- ISO 639-3: nii
- Glottolog: niii1240

Nii is a Trans–New Guinea language of the Chimbu–Wahgi branch spoken in the highlands of Papua New Guinea.

Nii has an unusual number of lateral consonants: a typical alveolar flap, /ɺ/, plus both dental and velar lateral fricatives, /ɬ̪/ and /𝼄/, which are voiced between vowels and do not occur in initial position.

== Phonology ==
Note: the source used here is unreliable.

=== Vowels ===
	Front	Central	Back
High	i	u~ʊ	
Near-High	ɪ~ᵻ		
Mid	ɛ		o~ɔ
Open	a		

=== Consonants ===
Nii consonants (Stucky 1973)
	Labial	Dental	Alveolar	Palatal	Velar
Nasal	m	n̪	n		ŋ
Prenasalized	ᵐb	ⁿdz	ⁿd		ᵑɡ
Oral	p	s̪	r		k
Lateral		ɬ̪	ɺ		𝼄
Approximant	w			j	

Nii consonant allophones (Stucky 1973)
Phoneme	word- initial	inter- vocalic	word- final	utterance- final
/p/	[p]~[b]		[pᵊ]~[pʰ]	[pʰ]
/s/	[s̪]~[t̪s̪]~[t̪]	[s̪]~[t̪]	[s̪]~[t̪s̪]	
/r/	[t]~[r]^{(?)} (after another word)	[ɾ]~[r]	[r̥] (after a vowel)	
/k/	[k]~[ɡ]		[kᵊ]~[kʰ]	[kʰ]
/mb/	[mb]	[mb]~[mp]	[mpᵊ]~[mpʰ]	[mpʰ]
/ndz/	[n̪d̪z]~[n̪t̪s]***		[n̪d̪z]~[n̪t̪s]~[n̪s]	
/nd/	[nd]~[nt]		[ntᵊ]~[ntʰ]	[ntʰ]~[nt𐞩̥]
/ŋɡ/	[ŋk]~[ŋɡ]		[ŋkᵊ]~[ŋkʰ]	[ŋkʰ]
/ɬ/	NA	[ɮ̪]*	[ɬ̪]	
/ɺ/	NA	[ɺ]**	NA	
/𝼄/	NA	[ʟ̝]	[𝼄]~[𝼄ᵊ]	[𝼄]

* /ɬ/ is evidently [l̪] before a consonant
** /ɺ/ is [l] before /r/; in word-final position this sequence becomes [lt𐞩̥] ~ [ltʰ].
*** /ndz/ may have a vocoid release [n̪d̪zᶦ] at the end of a syllable before a consonant.

The account of the initial allophones of /r/ is confused, and some of the other positions are not completely clear.
