= Kuman language (New Guinea) =

Trans–New Guinea language spoken in Papua New Guinea

Kuman
- Native to: Papua New Guinea
- Region: Chimbu Province, from Kundiawa to beyond Kerowagi in the west and Gembogl in the north, at the foot of Mount Wilhelm
- Native speakers: (120,000 cited 2000 census); L2: 70,000 (2021)
- Language family: Trans–New Guinea: Chimbu–Wahgi; Chimbu; Kuman

Language codes
- ISO 639-3: kue
- Glottolog: kuma1280

Kuman (also Chimbu or Simbu) is a language of Chimbu Province, Papua New Guinea. In 1994, it was estimated that 80,000 people spoke Kuman, with 10,000 of them being monolingual in the language. In the 2000 census, 115,000 Kuman-speakers were reported, with few monolinguals. Ethnologue reported 70,000 second language speakers in 2021.

== Phonology ==
=== Consonants ===
		Labial	Alveolar	Palatal	Velar
Plosive	voiceless	p	t		k
Plosive	prenasal/vd.	ᵐb ~ b	ⁿd ~ d		ᵑɡ ~ g
Nasal		m	n		
Fricative			s		
Tap			ɾ		
Lateral			l		ʟ
Semivowel		w		j	

- Voiced plosives are usually prenasal, but may fluctuate in word-initial position as ordinary voiced stops [b, d, ɡ].
- Voiceless stops /p, t, k/ are always aspirated [pʰ, tʰ, kʰ] in word-initial position.
- /ɾ/ only occurs word-medially and word-finally. In word-final position it is heard as a trill [r].
- /s/ can be pronounced as [s], [ᵗs] in word-initial position.
- /w/ can be pronounced as [β] before front vowels /i, e/.
- Like other Chimbu languages, Kuman has rather unusual lateral consonants. /ʟ/ is heard as voiceless velar lateral [ʟ̥] when preceding a consonant. It is also heard as a voiceless alveolar fricative [ɬ] before an /s/. It may also be realized as a "laterally released velar affricate" (presumably [ɡʟ̝], found in other Papuan languages) which is voiced word medially and voiceless word finally (not occurring word initially).

=== Vowels ===
	Front	Central	Back
High	i		u
Mid	e		o
Low		a	

- /a/ can be heard as either central [ä] or back [ɑ] in free variation.
- /e/ is pronounced as [ɛ] as a first vowel in a word.
- /o/ is pronounced in its lax form as [ɔ] before /ɾ/.

=== Syllable patterns ===
Syllable structure is (C)V(C). Any consonant can occur in onset position, but in coda position only /m/, /n/, /gɬ/, /l/ and /k/ can occur.

== Grammar ==
Kuman is a subject-object-verb (SOV) language.

== Vocabulary ==
The following basic vocabulary words are from Salisbury (1956) and Trefry (1969), as cited in the Trans-New Guinea database:

gloss	Kuman
head	bit-na; bɩtiɩno
hair	iŋguno; yungo
ear	kina-na; kunano
eye	gumutino; ongomit-na
nose	guma-ne; gumano
tooth	siŋguno
tongue	dirambino
leg	kati; kat-na
louse	numan
dog	aʝg; agi; akɬ ̥
pig	bogla; bugɬa
bird	kua
egg	mugɬo; muɬo
blood	borɔmai; bořumai; maiam
bone	yambiřo; yombura
skin	gaŋgino
breast	amu-na; amuno
tree	endi
man	yagl; yakɬ ̥
woman	ambu
sun	ande; andesuŋgua
moon	ba
water	nigl; nikɬ ̥
fire	baugl; doŋga
stone	kombuglo; kombugɬo
road, path	konbo; konumbo
name	kaŋgin; kangi-ne
eat	neuŋgua
one	suařa
two	suo
