= Kandawo language =

Language

Kandawo
- Native to: Papua New Guinea
- Region: Western Highlands Province
- Native speakers: 4,000 (2003)
- Language family: Trans–New Guinea: Chimbu–Wahgi; Jimi; Kandawo

Language codes
- ISO 639-3: gam
- Glottolog: kand1303

Kandawo, also known as Narake (but see related Narak) is a Trans–New Guinea language of Western Highlands Province, Papua New Guinea. A dialect survey of Kandawo has been conducted by Graham (1998).
