= Voiceless velar lateral fricative =

Consonantal sound represented by ⟨𝼄⟩ or ⟨ʟ̝̊⟩ in IPA

𝼄

ʟ̝̊

Audio sample
- source · help

Encoding
- X-SAMPA: L\_0_r
Image

A voiceless velar lateral fricative is a rare speech sound. As one element of an affricate, it is found for example in Zulu and Xhosa (see velar lateral ejective affricate). However, a simple fricative has only been reported from a few languages in the Caucasus and New Guinea.

In New Guinea, some of the Chimbu–Wahgi languages such as Melpa, Middle Wahgi, and Nii, have a velar lateral, which they write with a double-bar el (Ⱡ, ⱡ). One speaker of Kuman was found to have the voiceless fricative in syllable coda position as an allophone of a voiced velar lateral /ʟ/.

The extIPA has the letter ⟨𝼄⟩ for this sound. It was added to Unicode in 2021.

== Features ==
Features of a voiceless velar lateral fricative:

- Its manner of articulation is fricative, which means it is produced by constricting air flow through a narrow channel at the place of articulation, causing turbulence.
- Its place of articulation is velar, which means it is articulated with the back of the tongue (the dorsum) at the soft palate.
- Its phonation is voiceless, which means it is produced without vibrations of the vocal cords. In some languages the vocal cords are actively separated, so it is always voiceless; in others the cords are lax, so that it may take on the voicing of adjacent sounds.
- It is an oral consonant, which means that air is not allowed to escape through the nose.
- It is a lateral consonant, which means it is produced by directing the airstream over the sides of the tongue, rather than down the middle.
- Its airstream mechanism is pulmonic, which means it is articulated by pushing air only with the intercostal muscles and abdominal muscles, as in most speech sounds.

== Occurrence ==
Language	Word	IPA	Meaning	Notes
Wahgi	nòⱡ	[no𝼄˩]	'water'	

=== Voiceless velar lateral approximant ===
Voiceless velar lateral approximant

ʟ̥

ʟ̊
- IPA number: 158 402A

Encoding
- X-SAMPA: L\_0

Some scholars also posit a voiceless velar lateral approximant distinct from the fricative. The approximant may be represented in the IPA as ⟨ʟ̥⟩.

Language		Word	IPA	Meaning	Notes
English	Western American	clear	[kʟ̥iɚ̯]	'clear'	Possible allophone of /l/ after /k/. See English phonology
German	Austrian	klar	[kʟ̥ɑː]	'clear'	Possible allophone of /l/ after the aspirated allophone of /k/. See Standard German phonology
Welsh		pwll	[pʊʟ̥]	'pool'	Possible allophone of /ɬ/ after back vowels.

== See also ==
- Voiced velar lateral fricative
- Voiceless alveolar lateral fricative
- Voiceless velar fricative

== Notes ==
Place →	Labial					Coronal										Dorsal					Laryngeal			
Manner ↓	Bilabial		Labiodental		Linguolabial		Dental		Alveolar		Postalveolar		Retroflex		(Alveolo-)palatal		Velar		Uvular		Pharyngeal/epiglottal		Glottal	
Nasal	m̥	m	ɱ̊	ɱ		n̼	n̪̊	n̪	n̥	n	n̠̊	n̠	ɳ̊	ɳ	ɲ̊	ɲ	ŋ̊	ŋ	ɴ̥	ɴ				
Plosive	p	b	p̪	b̪	t̼	d̼	t̪	d̪	t	d			ʈ	ɖ	c	ɟ	k	ɡ	q	ɢ	ʡ		ʔ	
Sibilant affricate							t̪s̪	d̪z̪	ts	dz	t̠ʃ	d̠ʒ	tʂ	dʐ	tɕ	dʑ								
Non-sibilant affricate	pɸ	bβ	p̪f	b̪v			t̪θ	d̪ð	tɹ̝̊	dɹ̝	t̠ɹ̠̊˔	d̠ɹ̠˔			cç	ɟʝ	kx	ɡɣ	qχ	ɢʁ	ʡʜ	ʡʢ	ʔh	
Sibilant fricative							s̪	z̪	s	z	ʃ	ʒ	ʂ	ʐ	ɕ	ʑ								
Non-sibilant fricative	ɸ	β	f	v	θ̼	ð̼	θ	ð	θ̠	ð̠	ɹ̠̊˔	ɹ̠˔	ɻ̊˔	ɻ˔	ç	ʝ	x	ɣ	χ	ʁ	ħ	ʕ	h	ɦ
Approximant		β̞		ʋ				ð̞		ɹ		ɹ̠		ɻ		j		ɰ						˷
Tap/flap		ⱱ̟		ⱱ					ɾ̥	ɾ			ɽ̊	ɽ						ɢ̆		ʡ̆		
Trill	ʙ̥	ʙ							r̥	r		r̠	ɽ̊r̥	ɽr					ʀ̥	ʀ	ʜ	ʢ		
Lateral affricate									tɬ	dɮ			tꞎ	d𝼅	c𝼆	ɟʎ̝	k𝼄	ɡʟ̝						
Lateral fricative							ɬ̪		ɬ	ɮ			ꞎ	𝼅	𝼆	ʎ̝	𝼄	ʟ̝						
Lateral approximant								l̪	l̥	l		l̠	ɭ̊	ɭ	ʎ̥	ʎ	ʟ̥	ʟ		ʟ̠				
Lateral tap/flap									ɺ̥	ɺ			𝼈̊	𝼈		ʎ̆		ʟ̆						

		BL	LD	D	A	PA	RF	P	V	U
Implosive	Voiced	ɓ			ɗ		ᶑ	ʄ	ɠ	ʛ
Implosive	Voiceless	ɓ̥			ɗ̥		ᶑ̊	ʄ̊	ɠ̊	ʛ̥
Ejective	Stop	pʼ			tʼ		ʈʼ	cʼ	kʼ	qʼ
Ejective	Affricate		p̪fʼ	t̪θʼ	tsʼ	t̠ʃʼ	tʂʼ	tɕʼ	kxʼ	qχʼ
Ejective	Fricative	ɸʼ	fʼ	θʼ	sʼ	ʃʼ	ʂʼ	ɕʼ	xʼ	χʼ
Ejective	Lateral affricate				tɬʼ			c𝼆ʼ	k𝼄ʼ	q𝼄ʼ
Ejective	Lateral fricative				ɬʼ					
Click (top: velar; bottom: uvular)	Tenuis	kʘ qʘ		kǀ qǀ	kǃ qǃ		k𝼊 q𝼊	kǂ qǂ		
Click (top: velar; bottom: uvular)	Voiced	ɡʘ ɢʘ		ɡǀ ɢǀ	ɡǃ ɢǃ		ɡ𝼊 ɢ𝼊	ɡǂ ɢǂ		
Click (top: velar; bottom: uvular)	Nasal	ŋʘ ɴʘ		ŋǀ ɴǀ	ŋǃ ɴǃ		ŋ𝼊 ɴ𝼊	ŋǂ ɴǂ	ʞ	
Click (top: velar; bottom: uvular)	Tenuis lateral				kǁ qǁ					
Click (top: velar; bottom: uvular)	Voiced lateral				ɡǁ ɢǁ					
Click (top: velar; bottom: uvular)	Nasal lateral				ŋǁ ɴǁ					
