= Reversed ge =

Letter of the Latin alphabet

Usage
- Writing system: Latin script
- Type: Alphabetic
- Language of origin: Abkhaz, Abaza, Kabardian, Udi
- Sound values: [ʒ], [ʑ], [t͡sʼ]

History
- Time period: 1920s to 1930s

Other
- Writing direction: left-to-right

Reversed ge (approximated as Г г) is an additional letter of the Latin script which was used in the writing of the Abkhaz language from 1928 to 1938, in the Abaza language, in the Kabardian language, and in the Udi language.

== Use ==
Reversed ge was used in the Abkhaz Latin alphabet of Yakovlev in 1930.

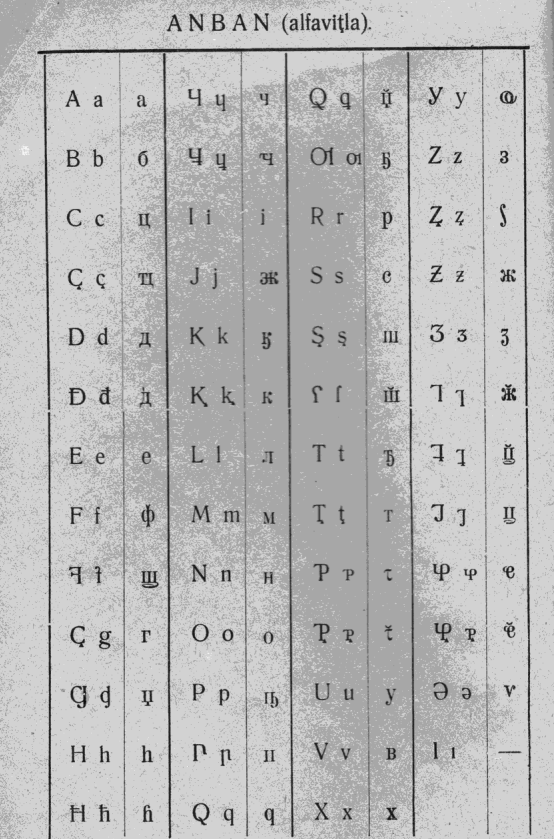
Abkhaz Latin alphabet of 1930.

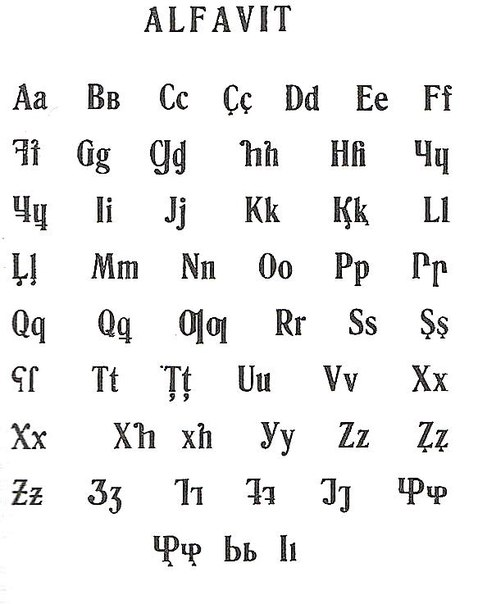
Abaza Latin alphabet of 1932.

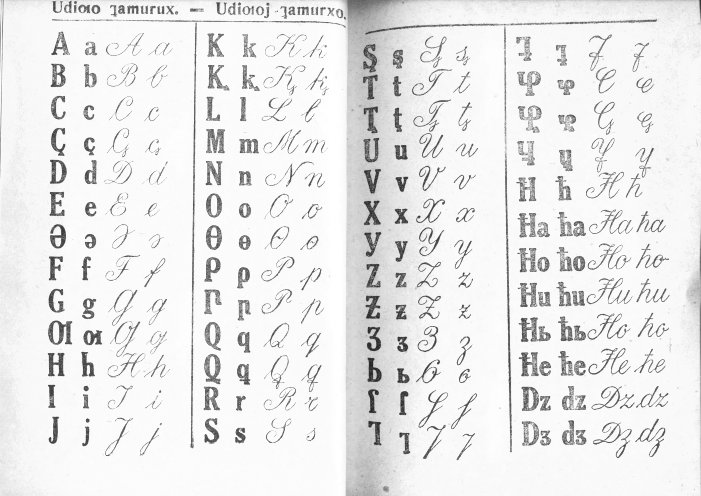
Udi Latin alphabet of 1934.

== Computing codes ==
Neither variant of this letter has a Unicode codepoint. In cases where it is possible, the letters U+0413 Г CYRILLIC CAPITAL LETTER GHE and U+0433 г CYRILLIC SMALL LETTER GHE can be reversed to approximate this letter.

== See also ==
- Ğ (G with breve)
- Abkhaz language

== Bibliography ==
- Joomagueldinov, Nurlan; Pentzlin, Karl; Yevlampiev, Ilya (18 October 2011). Proposal to encode Latin letters used in the Former Soviet Union (PDF).
- Joomagueldinov, Nurlan; Pentzlin, Karl; Yevlampiev, Ilya (29 January 2012). Revised proposal to encode Latin letters used in the Former Soviet Union (PDF).
