= Livestock Wealth =

South-Africa-based crowdfunding company

- Company type: Private company
- Industry: Financial services
- Founded: 2015; 10 years ago
- Founder: Ntuthuko Shezi
- Headquarters: Johannesburg, South Africa
- Key people: Ntuthuko Shezi (CEO), Ken Robinson (Advisory Board)
- Products: Livestock investment
- Website: www.livestockwealth.com

Livestock Wealth is a South African-based crowdfunding company that focuses on funding for cattle. The company connects investors with farmers that require funding by using cattle as a form of investment. For example, options include the purchase of grass fed beef cattle; a pregnant cow, a calf or the shared purchase of a calf.

The company is headquartered in Johannesburg and has a number of farms in their portfolio based in Free State and KwaZulu Natal. Investors can access the investment platform through a mobile app utilizing 5G and AI technology developed in conjunction with Chinese mobile phone company Huawei.

== History ==
Livestock Wealth was founded in 2015 by Ntuthuko Shezi who is still the CEO.

In 2017 Livestock Wealth won the South African Breweries Foundation Social Innovation award cabled by R1.3 million.

On June 30 2025, it was reported that Livestock Wealth is under investigation for alleged illegal operations.
