= Narak language =

Jimi language spoken in Papua New Guinea

Narak
- Native to: Papua New Guinea
- Region: Western Highlands Province
- Ethnicity: Morkai
- Native speakers: (6,200 cited 2000 census)
- Language family: Trans–New Guinea: Chimbu–Wahgi; Jimi; Narak

Language codes
- ISO 639-3: nac
- Glottolog: nara1264

Narak is a Trans–New Guinea language of Western Highlands Province, Papua New Guinea.
