= Approximant =

Type of speech sound

Approximants are speech sounds that involve the articulators approaching each other but not narrowly enough, nor with enough articulatory precision, to create turbulent airflow. Therefore, approximants fall between fricatives, which have a degree of constriction tight enough to produce a turbulent airstream, and vowels, which have no constriction. This class includes vowel-like sounds such as [j] and [w] (as in yes and west, respectively), as well as liquids such as [l] and [ɹ] (as in less and rest, respectively), among other consonants with relatively low degrees of stricture. They are a subclass of sonorants and continuants.

== Terminology ==
Before Peter Ladefoged coined the term approximant in the 1960s, the terms frictionless continuant and semivowel were used to refer to non-lateral approximants. As a distinctive feature, approximant has also sometimes been expanded to encompass vowels in addition to semivowels (glides) and liquids.

== Semivowels ==
Some approximants resemble vowels in acoustic and articulatory properties and the terms semivowel and glide are often used for these non-syllabic vowel-like segments. The correlation between semivowels and vowels is strong enough that cross-language differences between semivowels correspond with the differences between their related vowels. Semivowels may be distinguished from the rest of approximants via a feature of prolongability; while all other approximants are prolongable, semivowels are momentary, as prolonging them results instead in the formation of their vocalic equivalents ([j, w] → [i, u]).

Vowels and their corresponding semivowels alternate in many languages depending on the phonological environment, or for grammatical reasons, as is the case with Indo-European ablaut. Similarly, languages often avoid configurations where a semivowel precedes its corresponding vowel. A number of phoneticians distinguish between semivowels and approximants by their location in a syllable. Although he uses the terms interchangeably, Montreuil (2004, p. 104) remarks that, for example, the final glides of English par and buy differ from French par ('through') and baille ('tub') in that in the French examples, the approximants appear in the syllable coda, whereas in the English ones, they appear in the syllable nucleus. This means that opaque (if not minimal) contrasts can occur in languages like Italian (with the i-like sound of piede 'foot', appearing in the nucleus: [ˈpi̯ɛˑde], and that of piano 'plane', appearing in the syllable onset: [ˈpjaˑno]) and Spanish (with a near minimal pair being abyecto [aβˈjekto] 'abject' and abierto [aˈβi̯erto] 'opened').

In a related sense, the terms semivowel and semiconsonant are often treated as synonyms in English linguistic tradition, though the latter may be regarded as somewhat antiquated. However, in other linguistic traditions, a distinction is made between the two terms. In these traditions, semivowels refer to non-syllabic vowel offglides (such as [i̯, u̯]) often found as partial components of syllable nuclei (such as in diphthongs), while semiconsonants refer to consonant onglides (such as [j, w]) often found in syllable onsets. An example demonstrating this difference can be observed in the interjections yay [ˈjei̯] and wow [ˈwau̯].

=== Coordinate vowels ===
The following table demonstrates vowel correspondences with associated approximants. The § rhotic approximants listed here are not widely considered to be semivowels, but are provided as they do map to corresponding vowels.

Approximant-vowel correspondences
Vowel	Corresponding approximant	Place of articulation	Example
i	j (Note: Because the vowels [i ɯ] are articulated with spread lips, spreading is implied for their approximant analogues, [j ɰ]. However, these sounds generally have little or no lip-spreading. The fricative letters with a lowering diacritic, ⟨ʝ᫛ ɣ᫛⟩ (formerly ⟨ʝ˕ ɣ˕⟩), may therefore be justified for a neutral articulation between spread [j ɰ] and rounded [ɥ w].)	Palatal	Spanish amplío ('I extend') vs. amplió ('he extended')
y	ɥ	Labio-palatal	French aigu ('sharp') vs. aiguille ('needle')
ɯ	ɰ	Velar	Korean 음식 ('food') vs. 의사 ('doctor')
u	w	Labio-velar	Spanish continúo ('I continue') vs. continuó ('he/she/it continued') and ('you continued') used only in the formal treatment of usted.
ɑ	ʕ̞	Pharyngeal	
ɚ ~ ɝ	ɹ ~ ɻ	Alveolar ~ Retroflex (Note: Because of the articulatory complexities of the American English rhotic, there is some variation in its phonetic description. A transcription with the IPA character for an alveolar approximant ([ɹ]) is common, though the sound is more postalveolar. Actual retroflexion may occur as well and both occur as variations of the same sound. However, Catford (1988, p. 161 fn.) makes a distinction between the vowels of American English (which he calls "rhotacized") and vowels with "retroflexion" such as those that appear in Badaga; Trask (1996, p. 310), on the other hand, labels both as r-colored and notes that both have a lowered third formant.)	North American English waiter vs. waitress

==== Centralized correlates and symbolization ====
Although many languages have central vowels [ɨ, ʉ] – which lie between front/palatal [i, y] and back/velar [ɯ, u] – there are few cases of corresponding approximants [ ȷ̈, ɥ̈] (or equivalently, [ɰ̈, ẅ]). One such case is in the Korean diphthong [ ȷ̈i] or [ɨ̯i], though it is more frequently analyzed as velar (as in the table above). Mapudungun has three high vowel sounds /i, u, ɨ/, and three corresponding consonants, /j, w/ plus a third one often described as a (non-labialized) voiced velar fricative [ɣ]; some texts note a correspondence between this approximant and /ɨ/ that is parallel to /j/–/i/ and /w/–/u/. An example is in the term liq /ˈliɣ/ ([ˈliɨ̯]?) ('white').

It has been noted that the expected symbols for the approximant correlates of [ɨ, ʉ] are ⟨ɉ, w̶⟩, ⟨ɉ, ɥ̶⟩, or ⟨ɰ̶, ɥ̶⟩ (as such, the correlate vowels may also be transcribed as ⟨ɯ̶, ɏ⟩). An additional distinction of roundedness type may also be made between [ɥ̈ / ɥ̶] and [ẅ / w̶]: the former being compressed, and the latter protruded (the same distinction may be applied to [ÿ / ɏ] and [ʉ]). One might also distinguish [ ȷ̈ / ɉ] and [ɰ̈ / ɰ̶] by slight degrees of fronting and backing (and by extension, [ɨ] and [ɯ̈ / ɯ̶]), thus being referred to as post-palatal and pre-velar, respectively.

=== Alternation and glide-formation ===
In articulation and often diachronically, palatal approximants correspond to front vowels, velar approximants to back vowels, and labialized approximants to rounded vowels. In American English, the rhotic approximant corresponds to the rhotic vowel. This can create alternations (as shown in the above table).

In addition to alternations, glides can be inserted to the left or the right of their corresponding vowels when they occur next to a hiatus. For example, in Ukrainian, medial /i/ triggers the formation of an inserted [j] that acts as a syllable onset so that when the affix /-ist/ is added to футбол ('football') to make футболіст 'football player', it is pronounced [futbo̞ˈlist], but маоїст ('Maoist'), with the same affix, is pronounced [mao̞ˈjist] with a glide. Dutch for many speakers has a similar process that extends to mid vowels:

- bioscoop → [bijɔskoːp] ('cinema')
- zee + en → [zeːjə(n)] ('seas')
- fluor → [flyɥɔr] ('fluorine')
- reu + en → [røɥə(n)] ('male dogs')
- Rwanda → [ruʋandɐ] ('Rwanda') (Note: There is dialectal and allophonic variation in the realization of /ʋ/. For speakers who realize it as [ʋ], Rubach (2002, p. 683) postulates an additional rule that changes any occurrence of [w] from glide insertion into [ʋ].)
- Boaz → [boʋas] ('Boaz')

Similarly, vowels can be inserted next to their corresponding glide in certain phonetic environments. Sievers' law describes this behaviour for Germanic.

Non-high semivowels also occur. In colloquial Nepali speech, a process of glide-formation occurs, where one of two adjacent vowels becomes non-syllabic; the process includes mid vowels so that [dʱo̯a] ('cause to wish') features a non-syllabic mid vowel. Spanish features a similar process and even nonsyllabic /a/ can occur so that ahorita ('right away') is pronounced [a̯o̞ˈɾita]. It is not often clear, however, whether such sequences involve a semivowel (a consonant) or a diphthong (a vowel), and in many cases, it may not be a meaningful distinction.

== Contrast with fricatives ==
According to their standard definitions, approximants (such as [j]) contrast with fricatives (such as [ʝ]) in that fricatives produce turbulence, but approximants do not. In addition to less turbulence, approximants also differ from fricatives in the precision required to produce them. When emphasized, approximants may be slightly fricated (that is, the airstream may become slightly turbulent), which is reminiscent of fricatives. However, such frication is generally slight and intermittent, unlike the strong turbulence of fricative consonants.

=== Spirants ===
==== Terminology and ambiguity ====
In discussing Spanish, Martínez-Celdrán (2004) suggested setting up a category of spirant approximants (such as [ʝ̞]) contrasting with both semivowel approximants and fricatives, described as "non-rhotic central approximants". (Note: Martínez-Celdrán (2004) cites Martinet (1967) [1956] as inspiration for using the term spirant, though Martinet had only distinguished non-semivowel approximants (thus including rhotics within this class) as spirants in contrast with fricatives in discussing the Savoyard dialect of Franco-Provençal, where the older definition of spirants as non-sibilant fricatives had already fallen out of favor.) The term has since been used with regularity by Martínez-Celdrán and other authors, particularly when discussing the phonetics of Spanish and other Iberian languages such as Galician. Ball & Rahilly (2011) revived the term "frictionless continuant" – which historically referred more broadly to non-lateral approximants – to distinguish this same class, and continued to use the term in subsequent works.

However, as Ball (2026a) notes, both the spirant and frictionless continuant terminologies suffer from some level of ambiguity, as they both recall older (albeit now mostly disused) definitions with subtle differences from their current meaning. Other names that have been used for this class invoke fricatives, with prefix modifiers such as "weak", "approximated", and "lenited". No dominant and preferred term has yet emerged, but for simplicity, this page uses spirant approximants. The class includes all approximants that are both non-liquid (rhotic and lateral) and non-semivowel. (Note: If recognized as a distinct subclass, § nasal approximants are also excluded from spirant approximants.) They remain distinct from fricatives in having the characteristic non-turbulent (laminar) airflow of approximants.

==== Examples and related ====
Though spirant approximants are more constricted (having a lower F_{2} amplitude), longer, and unspecified for rounding (viuda [ˈbjuða] 'widow' vs. ayuda [aˈʝʷuða] 'help'), the distributional overlap is limited. Spirant approximants can only appear in syllable onset (including word-initially, where semivowels never appear). The two overlap in distribution after /l/ and /n/: enyesar [ẽɲɟʝeˈsaɾ] ('to plaster') vs. aniego [ãˈnjeɣo] 'flood', and although there is dialectal and idiolectal variation, speakers may also exhibit other near-minimal pairs like abyecto [aβ̞ˈʝe̞tːo̞] 'abject' vs. abierto [aβ̞ˈje̞tːo̞] 'opened'. One potential minimal pair (depending on dialect) is ya visto [(ɟ)ʝaˈβisto] 'already seen' vs. y ha visto [jaˈβisto] 'and he has seen'.

The feature is not present in all dialects of Spanish. Other dialects differ either by merging the two and neutralizing the contrast, or conversely by enhancing the contrast through shifting the fricative to another place of articulation and potentially assibilating (such as [ʒ], a feature called zheísmo), like in Rioplatense Spanish (some dialects of Rioplatense, such as the Buenos Aires dialect, even devoice to [ʃ], a feature called sheísmo).

The syllabic fricatives found in some languages (sometimes referred to as "apical vowels", particularly in Sinological circles, as they behave like vowels phonologically) have also been reported to have similar features to spirant approximants, being approximant-like in their articulation.

=== Gutturals ===
For places of articulation further back in the mouth, from uvular to epiglottal (which may be grouped under the umbrella term guttural consonants), languages do not contrast voiced fricatives and approximants. Therefore, the assigned symbols in the IPA for the voiced fricatives of these places are typically also used for the approximants, and often without a lowering diacritic.

Occasionally, the glottal "fricatives" are described as approximants, since [h] typically has no more frication than voiceless approximants (described in the section below), but they are often segmental phonations of the glottis without any accompanying manner or place of articulation.

=== Voicelessness ===
There has historically been some controversy over whether voiceless approximants can exist. Positions against the phonetic category have included the argument that voiceless airflow is necessarily turbulent and therefore by definition produces a fricative sound, while others have argued that the terminology is somewhat contradictory, as such sounds would be inaudible by definition of approximants (see § Disagreement over use of the term below). In contrast, more recent research distinguishes between turbulent (fricative-like) and laminar (vowel- or approximant-like) airflow in the vocal tract, with voiced fricatives characterized by more strongly turbulent airflow than voiceless fricatives due to tighter glottal constriction. Ball & Rahilly (1999) state that "the airflow for voiced approximants remains laminar (smooth), and does not become turbulent," while with voiceless approximants airflow is "usually somewhat turbulent"; because of this, the distinction between voiceless approximants and voiceless fricatives is not always clear. As such, voiceless approximants are rarely, if ever, distinguished phonemically from voiceless fricatives in the sound system of a language. Clark & Yallop (1995) discuss the issue and conclude "In practice, it is difficult to distinguish between a voiceless approximant and a voiceless fricative at the same place of articulation [...] there is no evidence that any language in the world makes such a distinction crucial."

==== Phonetic characteristics ====
Fricative consonants are generally said to be the result of turbulent airflow at a place of articulation in the vocal tract. However, an audible voiceless sound may be made without this turbulent airflow: Pike (1943) makes a distinction between "local friction" (as in [s] or [z]) and "cavity friction" (as in voiceless vowels like [ḁ] and [ɔ̥]). More recent research distinguishes between "turbulent" and "laminar" airflow in the vocal tract. It is not clear if it is possible to describe voiceless approximants categorically as having laminar airflow (or cavity friction in Pike's terms) as a way of distinguishing them from fricatives. Ball & Rahilly (1999) write that "the airflow for voiced approximants remains laminar (smooth), and does not become turbulent. Voiceless approximants are rare in the languages of the world, but when they do occur the airflow is usually somewhat turbulent." Audible voiceless sounds may also be produced by means of turbulent airflow at the glottis, as in [h]; in such a case, it is possible to produce an audible voiceless sound without the production of local friction at a supraglottal constriction, and thus lacking turbulence at the articulators. Catford (1982) [1977] defines both voiceless approximants and voiceless resonants, (Note: In Catford's definitions, the category of approximants includes close vowels such as [i, u], semivowels such as [j, w], liquids such as [ɹ, l], and spirants such as [ʋ]; while the category of resonants includes more open vowels such as [ɛ, a], as well as the aforementioned glottis-only production.) but suggests that both classes are necessarily turbulent in some form, stating that "[approximants] have non-turbulent flow when voiced; but the flow becomes turbulent when they are made voiceless [...] In voiceless resonants, such as [ɛ̥], [...] there must always be turbulent flow through the glottis; if there were not, there would simply be silence."

==== Debated status ====
Voiceless approximants are treated as a phonetic category by (among others) Catford (1982) [1977], Ladefoged & Maddieson (1996), and Bickford & Floyd (2006). However, the term voiceless approximant is seen by some phoneticians as controversial. It has been pointed out that if approximant is defined as a speech sound that involves the articulators approaching each other but not narrowly enough to create turbulent airflow, then it is difficult to see how a voiceless approximant could be audible. As John C. Wells puts it in his blog, "voiceless approximants are by definition inaudible [...] If there's no friction and no voicing, there's nothing to hear." A similar point is made in relation to frictionless continuants by O'Connor (1973): "There are no voiceless frictionless continuants because this would imply silence; the voiceless counterpart of the frictionless continuant is the voiceless fricative." Ohala & Solé (2010) argue that the increased airflow arising from voicelessness alone makes a voiceless continuant a fricative, even if lacking a greater constriction in the oral cavity than a voiced approximant.

Ladefoged & Maddieson (1996) argue that Burmese and Standard Tibetan have voiceless lateral approximants [l̥] and Navajo and Zulu voiceless lateral fricatives [ɬ], but also say that "in other cases it is difficult to decide whether a voiceless lateral should be described as an approximant or a fricative". Asu, Nolan & Schötz (2015) compared voiceless laterals in Estonian Swedish, Icelandic, and Welsh and found that Welsh-speakers consistently used [ɬ], that Icelandic-speakers consistently used [l̥], and that speakers of Estonian Swedish varied in their pronunciation. They conclude that there is "a range of variants within voiceless laterals, rather than a categorical split between lateral fricatives and voiceless approximant laterals".

Ball (2026a) reiterates that "it is a matter of debate as to whether voiceless equivalents of approximants can still be considered approximants or whether they should be termed fricatives". According to Ball, the arguments in favor of the recognition of voiceless approximants can be broken down into two primary positions: from a phonological standpoint, and from a phonetic one. The phonological position is one of "economical" explanations when addressing voiceless allophones of approximants in restricted environments. For example, it is simplest to describe only the devoicing of approximants within consonant clusters when preceded by voiceless consonants in English, such as in the words play [pl̥eɪ] and pray [pɹ̥eɪ], rather than additionally describing changes in manner of articulation. The phonetic position focuses on the distinction of turbulent versus laminar airflow, as described above. However, it may also compound with the phonological position: as Ball notes, there is a clear auditory difference between the phonemic voiceless lateral [ɬ] in Welsh and the allophonic voiceless lateral in English [l̥], and demonstrates this difference with data from recordings of a bilingual Welsh–English speaker reading aloud the English word slay [sl̥eɪ] and the Welsh word lle [ɬe] ('place').

== Rhotics ==
The phonetic features that define rhotic consonants are not well understood, despite many attempts to establish their unification. Instead, they are largely understood to be unified by their orthographic representation, such as with ⟨R r⟩ in Latin scripts, ⟨Ρ ρ⟩ in Greek scripts, and ⟨Р р⟩ in Cyrillic scripts. Similarly, within the IPA, rhotics are typically represented with a variety of symbols derived from the Latin letter ⟨R r⟩; in their unmarked forms (without diacritics), they represent a range of articulatory manners, including trills, taps, fricatives, and approximants (thus making [+continuant] one of their primary shared features). Nonetheless, there have been multiple studies showing their perceptual unity as a natural class, as well as to some extent their acoustic and phonological similarities. Furthermore, rhotics exhibit a degree of unity through contrast: they are distinctive enough for other consonant types to be defined as "non-rhotic" (i.e. [−rhotic] in featural phonology), such as the § spirant approximants described above. Studies have also shown sulcalization to be a frequent feature in rhotics.

The most widely recognized rhotic approximants are alveolar [ɹ], retroflex [ɻ], and uvular [ʁ̞], along with their postalveolar [ɹ̠] and velar [ɹ̈] analogues. These approximants often exhibit free variation with one another, such as in English and in Dutch, though their target places of articulation may also be more stable in other languages. In languages where they are in free variation, they are grouped under a single phoneme often transcribed as simply /r/; this reflects the broader class of rhotics, typical orthography, and typographic ease rather than specifically the alveolar trill [r] of the IPA (which may also be an allophone of this same phoneme). No language has been well-established to have a phonemic distinction between any two of these rhotic approximants.

=== Taps and trills ===
However, despite the widespread lack of a phonemic distinction between the typical rhotic approximants, many languages have a phonemic contrast between at least two general rhotic consonants; a well-known example is a contrast between a tap /ɾ/ and a trill /r/. In Spanish, these are typically distinguished in orthography with ⟨r⟩ for the tap and ⟨rr⟩ for the trill (though the trill may also appear in some words with a singular ⟨r⟩, and ⟨rr⟩ may be reduced to a tap in some environments). As described in the § spirants section above, Spanish is also well-known for its lenition (weakening) of plosive and fricative consonants to approximant ones (as are several other Romance languages), such as /b, d, ʝ, ɡ/ to [β̞, ð̞, ʝ̞, ɣ̞]. It has been reported by several authors that this lenition is extended to the tap and trill in some environments for multiple varieties of Spanish, where /ɾ, r/ become [ɾ̞, r̞], being referred to as an approximant tap and approximant trill, respectively. Thus, taking into account these allophones, a distinction between two rhotic approximants does exist in some languages.

Such sounds are distinct from typical taps and trills, as well as the reported tapped fricative (also usually transcribed as [ɾ̞]) and fricative trill (usually transcribed as [r̝]) found in some languages, in that the approximant tap and trill lack the characteristic burst release of the aforementioned sounds, and maintain the characteristic formant structures of vowels and approximants. Martínez-Celdrán, Romera Barrios & Elvira-García (2026) demonstrate this distinction with a spectrogram analysis of two examples: a standard tap in pera [ˈpeɾa] 'pear' versus an approximant tap in dura [ˈd̪uɾ̞a] 'hard', and a standard trill in burra [ˈbura] 'female donkey' versus an approximant trill in adjudicar [aðχuð̞iˈkar̞] 'adjudicate'.

== Nasals ==
Authors have occasionally used the terms "nasal approximants" and "nasalized approximants" to describe sounds with varying degrees of nasality. While they often are treated as synonyms, a distinction may be made between these two terms, particularly for usage in clinical linguistics: nasal approximants describe sounds that target nasal occlusives (such as ⟨n, ɲ, ŋ, ɴ⟩) but have insufficient articulator closure, while nasalized approximants describe sounds that target approximants (such as ⟨ɹ, j, ɰ, ʁ̞⟩) but have a lowering of the velum in their production or an insufficient closure of the velopharyngeal port. The distinction may be transcribed as a nasal occlusive with a downtack (such as ⟨n̞, ɲ᫛, ŋ᫛, ɴ̞⟩) for nasal approximants, and an approximant with a combining tilde above (such as ⟨ɹ̃, j̃, ɰ̃, ʁ̞̃⟩) for nasalized approximants.

== Types ==
The following is an overview of the various types (subclasses) of approximants, aside from those already described in the sections above:

- Labial approximants: labial approximants do not involve the tongue in their articulation, with the constriction instead being primarily directed along the lips. They are considered to be the frontmost subset of § spirant approximants. For labial approximants that do involve articulation with the tongue, see § doubly articulated approximants below.
- Median approximants: median (or central) approximants involve some portion of the tongue in their articulation, with airflow directed along the midline. At their respective points of articulation, they contrast with lateral approximants (below). For § semivowels and § rhotic approximants, they may also be contrasted with median § spirant approximants of the same place.
- Lateral approximants: in lateral approximants, the center of the tongue is raised, and may make contact with the roof of the mouth. However, the defining location is the sides of the tongue, which only approach the teeth, allowing free passage of air. At their respective points of articulation, they contrast with median approximants (above).
- Lateral–median approximants: lateral–median approximants are a rare set of approximants that are produced with qualities between lateral and median approximants. (Note: These may only be reported for a single language, Nuosu Yi, where they are the result of an assimilation process between lateral and spirant approximants.)
- Glottal approximants: glottal approximants may be best described as placeless with only laryngeal specification, as they take on the shapes of surrounding sounds in their articulation; see Phonation § Glottal consonants. Although similar in name, these are not the same as the glottalic approximants described below.
- Glottalic approximants: the typical airstream mechanism of approximants is pulmonic egressive, and their typical phonation state is modal voice. However, some languages also exhibit glottalic approximants, which may be realized with preglottalization (such as [ˀw]), postglottalization (such as [wˀ]), or laryngealization (such as [w̰]); see Glottalic sonorant. Although similar in name, these are not the same as the glottal approximants described above.
- Doubly articulated approximants: doubly articulated approximants feature two simultaneous places of articulation. For semivowels, these are typically with co-occurring labialization. For lateral approximants, these are typically with co-occurring velarization, uvularization, or pharyngealization.

=== Table ===
The following is a table of all attested approximant configurations, with two exceptions:

1. Regarding secondary articulation types, only doubly articulated approximants that have warranted the IPA to possess distinct letters for their combined qualities are included. Labialization is only shown for semivowels, as it aligns with the roundedness of their vocalic counterparts. Velarization (or uvularization or pharyngealization) is only shown for laterals ("dark l"). These types of secondary articulation, as well as palatalization, do occur with other subclasses of approximants (sometimes contrastively, such as in languages with hard–soft or broad–slender distinctions), but are not shown here.
2. For simplicity and to avoid diacritic stacking, § glottalic approximants are only shown with a preceding superscript, as in ⟨ˀw⟩. However, this should not be interpreted as preglottalization being the only realization of these sounds. Generally speaking, as with all glottalic sonorants, the timing of glottalization for approximants is fluid.

Additionally, the § labial and § glottal approximants are grouped with the § median approximants as they also apply to the § spirant subclass, though they are not actually median consonants as they do not involve the tongue as an articulator. The approximant tap and approximant trill § rhotics are grouped with their standard alveolar rhotic approximant counterpart, as no other configurations of these kinds have been reported.

For some configurations, letters shown with the lowered diacritic ⟨˕⟩ are often transcribed without it; the diacritic is used here to distinguish from their fricative counterparts.

Attested approximant configurations
Place → Features ↓						Bilabial	Labio-dental	Inter-dental	Dental	Denti-alveolar	Alveolar			Post-alveolar	Retroflex	Alveolo-palatal	Palatal	Post-palatal		Velar	Uvular	Pharyngeal/ Epiglottal	Glottal	
Airflow	Subclass	Voicing	Double articulator	Setting		Bilabial	Labio-dental	Inter-dental	Dental	Denti-alveolar	Alveolar			Post-alveolar	Retroflex	Alveolo-palatal	Palatal	Post-palatal		Velar	Uvular	Pharyngeal/ Epiglottal	Glottal	
Airflow	Subclass	Voicing	Double articulator	Velic	Laryngeal	Bilabial	Labio-dental	Inter-dental	Dental	Denti-alveolar	Alveolar			Post-alveolar	Retroflex	Alveolo-palatal	Palatal	Post-palatal		Velar	Uvular	Pharyngeal/ Epiglottal	Glottal	
Median	Semivowel	voiced	plain	oral	modal	—N/a											j	ȷ̈	ɰ̈	ɰ		ʕ̞	—N/a	
Median	Semivowel	voiced	plain	oral	glottalic	—N/a											ˀj			ˀɰ		ˀʕ̞	—N/a	
Median	Semivowel	voiced	plain	nasalized		—N/a											j̃			ɰ̃			—N/a	
Median	Semivowel	voiced	labialized (Note: Equivalent to the roundedness of their counterpart vowels.)	oral	modal	—N/a											ɥ	ɥ̈	ẅ	w		ʕ̞᫇	—N/a	
Median	Semivowel	voiced	labialized	oral	glottalic	—N/a											ˀɥ			ˀw		ˀʕ̞᫇	—N/a	
Median	Semivowel	voiced	labialized	nasalized		—N/a											ɥ̃			w̃			—N/a	
Median	Semivowel	voiceless	plain	oral		—N/a											j̊			ɰ̊			—N/a	
Median	Semivowel	voiceless	plain	nasalized		—N/a											j̥̃						—N/a	
Median	Semivowel	voiceless	labialized	oral		—N/a											ɥ̊			w̥		ħ̞	—N/a	
Median	Semivowel	voiceless	labialized	nasalized		—N/a														w̥̃			—N/a	
Median	Spirant	voiced		oral	modal	β̞ (Note: There have been repeated requests that the IPA create dedicated symbols for [β̞] and [ð̞] – typically modifications of the base letters such as turned ⟨β⟩ and ⟨ð⟩ or reversed ⟨β⟩ and ⟨ð⟩ – but so far the IPA has deemed that there is insufficient need for them. See Obsolete and nonstandard IPA symbols §§ voiced bilabial approximant and voiced dental approximant for other proposals.)	ʋ	ð̞᫈	ð̞	z̞᫈	z̞			ʒ᫛	ʐ᫛	ʑ᫛	ʝ᫛	ɣ̞᫈		ɣ᫛	(ʁ̞) (Note: While most often analyzed as a rhotic, some authors analyze the uvular approximant as a spirant instead. Such differences in analyses may depend on the language.)	ʢ̞	ɦ̞	˷
Median	Spirant	voiced		oral	glottalic	ˀβ̞	ˀʋ	ˀð̞᫈	ˀð̞	ˀz̞᫈	ˀz̞									ˀɣ᫛	(ˀʁ̞)	ˀʢ̞	ɦ̞	˷
Median	Spirant	voiced		nasalized		β̞̃	ʋ̃													ɣ̞̃	(ʁ̞̃)		ɦ̞̃	
Median	Spirant	voiceless		oral		ɸ̞	ʋ̥	θ̞᫈	θ̞	s̞᫈	s̞			ʃ̞	ʂ᫛	ɕ᫛	ç᫛	x̞᫈		x̞	χ᫛	ʜ̞	h̞	
Median	Spirant	voiceless		nasalized																			h̞̃	
Median	Rhotic	voiced		oral	modal				ɹ̪	ɹ̟	ɹ	ɾ̞	r̞	ɹ̠	ɻ					ɹ̈	ʁ̞			
Median	Rhotic	voiced		oral	glottalic						ˀɹ				ˀɻ						ˀʁ̞			
Median	Rhotic	voiced		nasalized							ɹ̃				ɻ̃						ʁ̞̃			
Median	Rhotic	voiceless									ɹ̥				ɻ̊									
Median	Nasal	voiced				m̞					n̞						ɲ᫛			ŋ᫛	ɴ̞	—N/a		
Lateral–median		voiced				—N/a					ʫ̞											—N/a		
Lateral–median		voiceless				—N/a					ʪ̞											—N/a		
Lateral		voiced	plain	oral	modal	—N/a		l̪͆	l̪	l̟	l			l̠	ɭ	ȴ	ʎ			ʟ	ʟ̠	—N/a		
Lateral		voiced	plain	oral	glottalic	—N/a			ˀl̪	ˀl̟	ˀl						ˀʎ			ˀʟ		—N/a		
Lateral		voiced	plain	nasalized		—N/a			l̪̃	l̟̃	l̃						ʎ̃			ʟ̃		—N/a		
Lateral		voiced	velarized (Note: May also be uvularized or pharyngealized. Velarized is the primary listing for simplicity only.)	oral	modal	—N/a		ɫ̪͆	ɫ̪	ɫ̟	ɫ			ɫ̠	ɭ̴	ȴ̴	ʎ̴			ʟ̴		—N/a		
Lateral		voiced	velarized	oral	glottalic	—N/a			ˀɫ̪	ˀɫ̟	ˀɫ											—N/a		
Lateral		voiced	velarized	nasalized		—N/a			ɫ̪̃	ɫ̟̃	ɫ̃											—N/a		
Lateral		voiceless	plain			—N/a			l̪̊	l̟̊	l̥			l̠̊	ɭ̊	ȴ̊	ʎ̥			ʟ̥		—N/a		
Lateral		voiceless	velarized			—N/a			ɫ̪̊	ɫ̟̊	ɫ̥											—N/a		

== See also ==
- Liquid consonant
- Semivowel
- List of phonetics topics

== Bibliography ==
- Akamatsu, Tsutomu (1992), "A critique of the IPA Chart" (PDF), Contextos, X (19–20): 7–42, archived (PDF) from the original on 2022-10-09
- Asu, Eva Liina; Nolan, Francis; Schötz, Susanne (2015), "A comparative study of Estonian Swedish voiceless laterals: Are voiceless approximants fricatives?" (PDF), Proceedings: 18th International Congress of Phonetic Sciences, University of Glasgow, ISBN 978-0-85261-941-4, archived (PDF) from the original on 2022-10-09
- Ashby, Michael; Maidment, John (2005), Introducing Phonetic Science, Cambridge, ISBN 0-521-00496-9
- Ball, Martin; Rahilly, Joan (1999), Phonetics: the Science of Speech, Arnold, ISBN 0-340-70010-6
- Ball, Martin J.; Müller, Nicole (2011) [2005], Phonetics for communication disorders, Psychology Press (Routledge), ISBN 978-0-8058-5363-6
- Ball, Martin; Rahilly, Joan (2011), "The symbolization of central approximants in the IPA", Journal of the International Phonetic Association, 41 (2): 231–237, doi:10.1017/S0025100311000107, JSTOR 44527032
- Ball, Martin; Rahilly, Joan; Lowry, Orla; Bessell, Nicola; Lee, Alice (2020), Phonetics for Speech Pathology, Communication Disorders and Clinical Linguistics (3rd ed.), University of Toronto Press, ISBN 978-1781791790
- Ball, Martin J. (2025), "Additional Phonetic Symbols for the Transcription of Typical and Atypical Speech", Journal of Connected Speech, 1 (1): 106–119, doi:10.3138/jcspeech.29303
- Ball, Martin J. (2026), The Phonetics and Phonology of Approximants, Studies in Phonetics and Phonology, Toronto, Buffalo, London: University of Toronto Press, pp. 1–504, ISBN 9781487528867
  - Ball, Martin J. (2026a), "1: What Are Approximants?", The Phonetics and Phonology of Approximants, Studies in Phonetics and Phonology, Toronto, Buffalo, London: University of Toronto Press, pp. 1–6, ISBN 9781487528867
  - McGuire, Grant (2026), "3: Perceptual Aspects of Approximants", in Ball, Martin J. (ed.), The Phonetics and Phonology of Approximants, Studies in Phonetics and Phonology, Toronto, Buffalo, London: University of Toronto Press, pp. 60–71, ISBN 9781487528867
  - Ball, Martin J. (2026b), "7: Transcription of Approximants", The Phonetics and Phonology of Approximants, Studies in Phonetics and Phonology, Toronto, Buffalo, London: University of Toronto Press, pp. 115–128, ISBN 9781487528867
  - Candia, Mauricio A. Figueroa; Rogers, Brandon M. A. (2026), "16: Spanish Approximants", in Ball, Martin J. (ed.), The Phonetics and Phonology of Approximants, Studies in Phonetics and Phonology, Toronto, Buffalo, London: University of Toronto Press, pp. 270–290, ISBN 9781487528867
  - Martínez-Celdrán, Eugenio; Romera Barrios, Lourdes; Elvira-García, Wendy (2026), "25: Is an Approximant Category Justified Phonetically and/or Phonologically?", in Ball, Martin J. (ed.), The Phonetics and Phonology of Approximants, Studies in Phonetics and Phonology, Toronto, Buffalo, London: University of Toronto Press, pp. 451–465, ISBN 9781487528867
- Bickford, Anita; Floyd, Rick (2006), Articulatory Phonetics (4th ed.), SIL International, ISBN 1-55671-165-4
- Bird, Sonya; Onosson, Sky (2023), "A phonetic case study of Tŝilhqot'in /z/ and /zˤ/", Journal of the International Phonetic Association, 53 (3): 835–868, doi:10.1017/S0025100322000093
- Boersma, Paul (1997), "Sound change in functional phonology", Functional Phonology: Formalizing the Interactions Between Articulatory and Perceptual Drives, The Hague: Holland Academic Graphics
- Bowen, J. Donald; Stockwell, Robert P. (1955), "The Phonemic Interpretation of Semivowels in Spanish", Language, 31 (2): 236–240, doi:10.2307/411039, JSTOR 411039
- Boyce, S.; Espy-Wilson, C. (1997), "Coarticulatory stability in American English /r/", Journal of the Acoustical Society of America, 101 (6): 3741–3753, Bibcode:1997ASAJ..101.3741B, doi:10.1121/1.418333, PMID 9193061
- Catford, J. C. (1982) [1977], Fundamental Problems in Phonetics, Indiana University Press, ISBN 0-85224-437-1
- Catford, J. C. (1988), A Practical Introduction to Phonetics, Oxford University Press, ISBN 0-19-824217-4
- Clark, John; Yallop, Colin (1995), An Introduction to Phonetics and Phonology (2nd ed.), Blackwell, ISBN 0-631-19452-5
- Delattre, P.; Freeman, D. C. (1968), "A dialect study of American R's by x-ray motion picture", Linguistics, 44: 29–68
- Edmondson, Jerold A.; Esling, John H.; Ziwo, Lama (拉玛兹偓) (April 2017), "Nuosu Yi (Illustrations of the IPA)", Journal of the International Phonetic Association, 47 (1): 87–97, doi:10.1017/S0025100315000444, S2CID 232345858
- Esling, John H. (2010), "Phonetic Notation", in Hardcastle, William J.; Laver, John; Gibbon, Fiona E. (eds.), The Handbook of Phonetic Sciences (2nd ed.), Wiley-Blackwell, pp. 678–702, doi:10.1002/9781444317251.ch18, ISBN 978-1-4051-4590-9
- Fonseca Quesada, Felix (December 2025), "Consonant clusters and rhotic variation in Costa Rican Spanish", Borealis, 14 (2): 385–403, doi:10.7557/1.14.2.8107
- Hall, T. A. (2007), "Segmental features", in de Lacy, Paul (ed.), The Cambridge Handbook of Phonology, Cambridge University Press, pp. 311–334, ISBN 978-0-521-84879-4
- Hallé, Pierre A.; Best, Catherine T.; Levitt, Andrea; Andrea (1999), "Phonetic vs. phonological influences on French listeners' perception of American English approximants", Journal of Phonetics, 27 (3): 281–306, doi:10.1006/jpho.1999.0097
- Hamann, Silke (2003), The Phonetics and Phonology of Retroflexes (PDF), Utrecht: LOT, ISBN 90-76864-39-X
- Kawasaki, Haruko (1982), An acoustical basis for universal constraints on sound sequences (doctoral dissertation), University of California, Berkeley
- Ladefoged, Peter (1964), A Phonetic Study of West African Languages, Cambridge: Cambridge University Press
- Ladefoged, Peter (1975), A Course in Phonetics, New York: Harcourt Brace Jovanovich
- Ladefoged, Peter; Maddieson, Ian (1996), The Sounds of the World's Languages, Oxford: Blackwell, ISBN 0-631-19815-6
- Maddieson, Ian; Emmorey, Karen (1985), "Relationship between semivowels and vowels: Cross-linguistic investigations of acoustic difference and coarticulation", Phonetica, 42 (4): 163–174, doi:10.1159/000261748, PMID 3842771, S2CID 46872676
- Martinet, André (1967) [1956], La Description phonologique avec application au parler franco-provençal d'Hauteville (Savoie), Publications Romanes et Françaises, Geneva & Paris: Librairie Droz & M.J. Minard, pp. 1–112, ISBN 9782600027861 – via Google Books
- Martínez-Celdrán, Eugenio; Fernández-Planas, Ana Ma.; Carrera-Sabaté, Josefina (2003), "Castilian Spanish", Journal of the International Phonetic Association, 33 (2): 255–259, doi:10.1017/S0025100303001373
- Martínez-Celdrán, Eugenio (2004), "Problems in the classification of approximants", Journal of the International Phonetic Association, 34 (2): 201–210, doi:10.1017/S0025100304001732, JSTOR 44526348, S2CID 144568679
- Martínez-Celdrán, Eugenio; Regueira, Xosé Luís (2008), "Spirant approximants in Galician", Journal of the International Phonetic Association, 38 (1): 51–68, doi:10.1017/S0025100308003265, JSTOR 44526963
- Montreuil, Jean-Pierre (2004), "From velar codas to high nuclei: phonetic and structural change in OT", Probus, 16: 91–111, doi:10.1515/prbs.2004.005
- O'Connor, J. D. (1973), Phonetics, Penguin
- Ohala, John J.; Solé, Maria-Josep (2010), "Turbulence and phonology" ( (PDF)), in Fuchs, Susanne; Toda, Martine; Żygis, Marzena (eds.), Turbulent Sounds: An Interdisciplinary Guide, Berlin: De Gruyter Mouton, pp. 37–101, doi:10.1515/9783110226584.37, ISBN 978-3-11-022657-7, archived from the original on 2021-06-03
- Pike, Kenneth (1943), Phonetics, University of Michigan Press
- Repiso-Puigdelliura, Gemma; Kim, Ji Young Kim (2021), "The Missing Link in Spanish Heritage Trill Production", Bilingualism: Language and Cognition, 24 (3): 454–466, doi:10.1017/S1366728920000668
- Rubach, Jerzy (2002), "Against subsegmental glides", Linguistic Inquiry, 33 (4): 672–687, doi:10.1162/ling.2002.33.4.672, S2CID 57566358
- Saporta, Sol (1956), "A Note on Spanish Semivowels", Language, 32 (2): 287–290, doi:10.2307/411006, JSTOR 411006
- Shadle, Christine (2000), "The Aerodynamics of Speech", in Hardcastle, W. J.; Laver, J. (eds.), Handbook of Phonetic Sciences, Blackwell, ISBN 0-631-18848-7
- Trager, George (1942), "The Phonemic Treatment of Semivowels", Language, 18 (3): 220–223, doi:10.2307/409556, JSTOR 409556
- Trask, Robert L. (1996), A Dictionary of Phonetics and Phonology, London: Routledge
- Wells, John (15 March 2007), "Chinese apical vowels", John Wells's phonetic blog, archived from the original on 24 October 2021
- Wells, John C. (7 April 2009), "[h]: Fricative or approximant?", John Wells's phonetic blog
- Zawadzki, P. A.; Kuehn, D. P. (1980), "A cineradiographic study of static and dynamic aspects of American English /r/", Phonetica, 37 (4): 253–266, doi:10.1159/000259995, PMID 7443796, S2CID 46760239

Place →	Labial					Coronal										Dorsal					Laryngeal			
Manner ↓	Bilabial		Labiodental		Linguolabial		Dental		Alveolar		Postalveolar		Retroflex		(Alveolo-)palatal		Velar		Uvular		Pharyngeal/epiglottal		Glottal	
Nasal	m̥	m	ɱ̊	ɱ		n̼	n̪̊	n̪	n̥	n	n̠̊	n̠	ɳ̊	ɳ	ɲ̊	ɲ	ŋ̊	ŋ	ɴ̥	ɴ				
Plosive	p	b	p̪	b̪	t̼	d̼	t̪	d̪	t	d			ʈ	ɖ	c	ɟ	k	ɡ	q	ɢ	ʡ		ʔ	
Sibilant affricate							t̪s̪	d̪z̪	ts	dz	t̠ʃ	d̠ʒ	tʂ	dʐ	tɕ	dʑ								
Non-sibilant affricate	pɸ	bβ	p̪f	b̪v			t̪θ	d̪ð	tɹ̝̊	dɹ̝	t̠ɹ̠̊˔	d̠ɹ̠˔			cç	ɟʝ	kx	ɡɣ	qχ	ɢʁ	ʡʜ	ʡʢ	ʔh	
Sibilant fricative							s̪	z̪	s	z	ʃ	ʒ	ʂ	ʐ	ɕ	ʑ								
Non-sibilant fricative	ɸ	β	f	v	θ̼	ð̼	θ	ð	θ̠	ð̠	ɹ̠̊˔	ɹ̠˔	ɻ̊˔	ɻ˔	ç	ʝ	x	ɣ	χ	ʁ	ħ	ʕ	h	ɦ
Approximant		β̞		ʋ				ð̞		ɹ		ɹ̠		ɻ		j		ɰ						˷
Tap/flap		ⱱ̟		ⱱ					ɾ̥	ɾ			ɽ̊	ɽ						ɢ̆		ʡ̆		
Trill	ʙ̥	ʙ							r̥	r		r̠	ɽ̊r̥	ɽr					ʀ̥	ʀ	ʜ	ʢ		
Lateral affricate									tɬ	dɮ			tꞎ	d𝼅	c𝼆	ɟʎ̝	k𝼄	ɡʟ̝						
Lateral fricative							ɬ̪		ɬ	ɮ			ꞎ	𝼅	𝼆	ʎ̝	𝼄	ʟ̝						
Lateral approximant								l̪	l̥	l		l̠	ɭ̊	ɭ	ʎ̥	ʎ	ʟ̥	ʟ		ʟ̠				
Lateral tap/flap									ɺ̥	ɺ			𝼈̊	𝼈		ʎ̆		ʟ̆						

		BL	LD	D	A	PA	RF	P	V	U
Implosive	Voiced	ɓ			ɗ		ᶑ	ʄ	ɠ	ʛ
Implosive	Voiceless	ɓ̥			ɗ̥		ᶑ̊	ʄ̊	ɠ̊	ʛ̥
Ejective	Stop	pʼ			tʼ		ʈʼ	cʼ	kʼ	qʼ
Ejective	Affricate		p̪fʼ	tθʼ	tsʼ	tʃʼ	tʂʼ	tɕʼ	kxʼ	qχʼ
Ejective	Fricative	ɸʼ	fʼ	θʼ	sʼ	ʃʼ	ʂʼ	ɕʼ	xʼ	χʼ
Ejective	Lateral affricate				tɬʼ			c𝼆ʼ	k𝼄ʼ	q𝼄ʼ
Ejective	Lateral fricative				ɬʼ					
Click (top: velar; bottom: uvular)	Tenuis	kʘ qʘ		kǀ qǀ	kǃ qǃ		k𝼊 q𝼊	kǂ qǂ		
Click (top: velar; bottom: uvular)	Voiced	ɡʘ ɢʘ		ɡǀ ɢǀ	ɡǃ ɢǃ		ɡ𝼊 ɢ𝼊	ɡǂ ɢǂ		
Click (top: velar; bottom: uvular)	Nasal	ŋʘ ɴʘ		ŋǀ ɴǀ	ŋǃ ɴǃ		ŋ𝼊 ɴ𝼊	ŋǂ ɴǂ	ʞ	
Click (top: velar; bottom: uvular)	Tenuis lateral				kǁ qǁ					
Click (top: velar; bottom: uvular)	Voiced lateral				ɡǁ ɢǁ					
Click (top: velar; bottom: uvular)	Nasal lateral				ŋǁ ɴǁ					
