= Wahgi language =

Trans–New Guinea language

Wahgi
- Native to: Papua New Guinea
- Region: Western Highlands Province
- Native speakers: (86,000 cited 1999)
- Language family: Trans–New Guinea: Chimbu–Wahgi; Wahgi languages; Wahgi

Language codes
- ISO 639-3: Either: wgi – Mid-Wahgi whg – North Wahgi
- Glottolog: nucl1620 Nuclear Wahgi nort2921 North Wahgi

Wahgi is a Trans–New Guinea language of the Chimbu–Wahgi branch spoken by approximately 100,000 people in the highlands of Papua New Guinea. Like other Chimbu languages, Wahgi has some unusual lateral consonants.

== Phonology ==
=== Consonants ===
Wahgi consonants
		Bilabial	(palatalized) dental	Alveolar	Palatal	Velar
Nasal		m	n̪~n̪ʲ	n		ŋ
Obstruent	oral	p	s̪~ɕ̪	t		k
Obstruent	prenasalised	ᵐb	ⁿd̪z̪~ⁿd̪ʑ̪	ⁿd		ᵑɡ
Lateral			ɬ̪~ɬ̪ʲ	ɺ		ʟ
Semivowel		w			j	

The dental consonants are "distributed", with closure along a considerable distance of the vocal tract. This presumably means that they are laminal, and that the alveolar consonants are apical. The dental consonants have palatalized allophones in free variation.

The description of the (palatalized) dentals suggest they may be alveolo-palatal or something similar. This is further suggested by transitional vowels triggered by /ɬ̪/, apparently even by its non-palatalized allophone: /oɬ̪/ [oɪ̯ɬ̪] 'moon', /ˈéɬ̪é/ [ˈéɬ̪ɪ̯è] [sic] 'here'.

The nasal element of the prenasalized consonants is syllabic when not preceded by a vowel, but takes a noncontrastive low tone and is never stressed: /ˈmbà/ [m̩̀ˈba] 'but', /ˈpɪ̀ɬ̪mbé/ [ˈpɪ̀ɬ̪m̩̄bé] 'we know'. Prenasalized consonants are perceived as single segments word-initially, but as nasal + stop word-medially.

Nasals and semivowels have no notable allophony, apart from the optional palatalization of /n̪/. The other consonants vary markedly, with most variants being positional:

Consonantal allophones
	word-initial	word-medial	word-final	word-initial, phrase-medial	word-final, phrase-medial
/p/	p~b pʷ~bʷ	p~b	pʰ~ɸ		pʰ~ɸ~pᵊ
/mb/	ᵐp~ᵐb	mp~mb	mpʰ~mɸ		mpʰ~mɸ~mpᵊ
/s/	t̪~t̪s̪~s̪~t̪ɕ~ɕ s̪ʷ	t̪s̪~s̪~t̪ɕ~ɕ t̪	t̪s̪~s̪~t̪ɕ~ɕ		
/nz/	ⁿd̪~ⁿd̪z̪~ⁿd̪ʑ~ⁿt̪~ⁿt̪s̪~ⁿt̪ɕ	n̪d̪~n̪d̪z̪~n̪d̪ʑ~n̪t̪~n̪t̪s̪~n̪t̪ɕ	n̪t̪~n̪t̪s̪~n̪t̪ɕ~n̪s̪~n̪ɕ		
/t/	t~d tʷ	ɾ~r	r̥	t~d ɾ~r	ɾ~r~r̥ t̚
/nd/	ⁿt~ⁿd	nt~nd	ntʰ		ntʰ~ntᵊ
/k/	k~ɡ kʷ~ɡʷ	k~ɡ ŋ (?)	kʰ		
/ng/	ᵑk~ᵑɡ ᵑɡʷ	ŋk~ŋɡ	(does not occur)		
/ɬ̪/	(do not occur)	ɬ̪ˢ̪~ɬ̪~ɮ̪	ɬ̪ˢ̪~ɬ̪		
/ɺ/	(do not occur)	ɺ̥~ɺ̥~ɺ̥tʰ~ɺ̥tr̥~ɺ̥r̥~ɺ~ɺ̥d	ɺ̥~ɺ̥~ɺ̥tʰ~ɺ̥tr̥~ɺ̥r̥		
/ʟ/	(do not occur)	ʟ~kʟ~ʟ̝~ɢ̆	ʟ~kʟ		

The southern Kuma dialect has these three laterals, though the alveolar is rather uncommon. (The northern Danga dialect has two laterals, dental fricative and alveolar flap.) The dental and velar laterals assimilate to [ɬ] or [ɬ̪] before dental and alveolar consonants; the alveolar only to [ɬ] before alveolar consonants. In locational forms with a suffix beginning with /t/, the /t/ is elided following the lateral, so that on the surface Wahgi distinguishes dental vs alveolar lateral fricatives and alveolar lateral fricatives vs flaps.

=== Vowels ===
Wahgi vowels
	Front	Central	Back
Close	i		u
Near-close	ɪ		
Mid	e		ɔ
Open		ä	

/a/ appears as [ä] in all positions except before /k/ and /p/, where it is [ɐ]. In medial position it is in occasional free variation with [æ].
/ɔ/ appears as [ɔ] in all positions except before nasals, where it is [ɒ]. Word-finally it is in free variation with [o].
/u/ is reduced to labialization ([ʷ]) between /p t s k ng/ and stressed /i/ or /ɪ/.

All vowels neutralize to [ɪ̈] in final unstressed closed syllables (disregarding subsequent "clitics").

In rapid speech, unstressed /u, ɪ, e/ elide between stressed syllables. For example, in rapid speech /ˈpetepˈka/ is pronounced [ˈpeɾpˈka].

=== Tone and stress ===
Wahgi appears to have three word tones rather than phonemic tone on each syllable. At least one syllable will have a phonetic high tone, with the resulting patterns of high, rising and falling on words of one or two syllables, and peaking, rising and falling on words of three to five syllables. Stress also appears to be contrastive, but analysis is difficult.

On both monosyllabic and disyllabic words, the three tones are realized as high, rising and falling: [HH], [LH] and [HL]. An analysis of two phonemic syllable tones, HIGH and LOW, is complicated by the appearance of all three word tones on monosyllables with final occlusive codas (and phonetically short vowels).

In polysyllabic words,

- HIGH (H) is phonetically high, optionally extra high on stressed syllables.
- LOW (L) is phonetically falling on unstressed syllables at the end of a prosodic phrase. It is phonetically mid between a high tone and another low tone (i.e. the sequence /HLL/ is [HML] and /LLH/ is [LMH]). It is phonetically low elsewhere.

On trisyllables, the patterns LHL, HLL, and LLH are attested. On tetrasyllables are LLHL, LLLH, and LHHL (that is, LMHL, LLMH, LHHL). On pentasyllables, only two patterns have been found, LLHHH and LLHHL (that is, LMHHH and LMHHL).

Words with six to nine syllables are only attested with a single pattern, a peaking tone (LHL) on the first three syllables followed by a falling tone (HL) stretched out over the remaining syllables. For words of six syllables, this is realized as LHLHLL (phonetically LHLHML); for seven, LHLHLLL; for eight, LHLHHLLL; for nine LHLHHLLLL. In each case, the second syllable (the first high tone) is also stressed, and it is not clear if these are actually double-peaking tones or single peaking tones with preceding stress. Regardless, there does not appear to be any phonemic distinction.

=== Phonotactics ===
The maximal syllable in Wahgi is CVCC; the minimal syllable is V, which may be any vowel but /ɪ/. Any consonant may occur in the onset except the three laterals. Any consonant may occur in the coda except the semivowels and /ng/. With a coda consonant cluster, the first consonant may only be /p, t, k, l̪, ʟ/ (the two common laterals) and the second may only be /m, s/.

A word may be anywhere from one to nine syllables long. A monosyllabic word may be any type of syllable but V and maybe CV. (Phonetic length and perhaps tone distribution suggests that words transcribed as CV monosyllables may actually be CVV with identical vowels.) Beside the syllable-onset and -coda restrictions, /i, ɪ/ may not occur word-initially and /ɪ/ may not occur word-finally.

Observed vowel clusters within words are /i.a, i.o, i.u; ɪ.i, ɪ.o; e.i, e.o, e.u; a.i, a.ɪ, a.e, a.a, a.u; o.i, o.o; u.i, u.ɪ, u.a, u.o, u.u/. In some cases (such as /ɪ.i/) these sequences reduce across morpheme boundaries, and stress seems to play a role in vowel reduction. It may be that some of the difficulties in analyzing stress may be a conflation of vowel sequences across syllables with sequences in single heavy (bimoraic CVV) syllables.

Observed consonant clusters within words are those allowed as syllable codas, /ps, pm, tm, ks, km, l̪s, l̪m, ʟm/, plus /p.p, p.t, p.nz; mb.p, mb.t, mb.m; t.p, t.mb, t.nd, t.n̪, t.n, t.ŋ; nd.p, nd.m; k.p; s.p, s.mb, s.nd, s.k, s.nz, s.m, s.n; nz.p, nz.m; m.p, m.nz, m.m, m.ŋ; n̪.p, n̪.m; n.p, n.m, n.ŋ; ŋ.p, ŋ.mb, ŋ.s, ŋ.nz, ŋ.m, ŋ.n; l̪.p, l̪.mb, l̪.t, l̪.k, l̪ [sic], l̪.w; l.mb, l.nd; ʟ.p, ʟ.mb, ʟ.t, ʟ.nz, ʟ.n, ʟ.ŋ, ʟ.w/.

In rapid speech, the following additional combinations are known: /ks.mp, ks.n, ks.m, ps.nd, lm.ŋ, tm.ŋ/.

== Evolution ==
Below are some reflexes of proto-Trans-New Guinea proposed by Pawley (2012), drawn from Ramsey (1975):

proto-Trans-New Guinea	Middle Wahgi
*ma- ‘NEG clitic’	ma ‘no!’
*ma(n,k,L)[a] ‘ground’	maɫ
*maŋgV ‘compact round object’	muŋ ‘fruit, nut, lump’
*mo(k,ŋg)Vm ‘joint’	mokum, mokem ‘knuckle, joint’
*mundun-maŋgV ‘heart’	mund-muŋ
*mV ‘taro’	mi
*mV(k,ŋ)V[C] + t(e,i)- ‘vomit’	mek (si-) ‘vomit’, mek ‘vomitus’
*am(a,i) ‘mother’	ama
*amu ‘breast’	am
*niman ‘louse’	numan
*n(o,u)man ‘mind, soul’	numan ‘thought, mind, will’
*kumV- ‘die’	kumb- ‘(of fire) die’
*mo(k,ŋg)Vm ‘joint’	mokum, mokem, (angeɫ) mokem ‘knuckle, joint’
*na- ‘eat’	no-
*niman ‘louse’	numan
*n(o,u)man ‘mind, soul’	numan ‘thought, mind, will’
*mundun ‘internal organs’	(?) mundun mo- ‘be pot-bellied’
*niman ‘louse’	numan
*n(o,u)man ‘mind, soul’	numan
*mundu[n]-maŋgV ‘heart’	mund-muŋ
*ŋaŋ[a] ‘baby’	ŋaŋ ‘small male child’
*ambi ‘man’	(?) amb ‘woman’, ambi- ‘wife’
*imbi ‘name’	embe(m)
*pu- ‘go’	pu
*apa ‘father’	apa- ‘maternal uncle’
*mund-mangV ‘heart’	mund-mung
*tVk- ‘cut, cut off’	tuk- ‘chop’
*maŋgV ‘compact round object’	mungum ‘kidney’
*maŋgV ‘compact round object’	muŋ ‘fruit, nut, lump’
*mundu[n]-maŋgV ‘heart’	mund-muŋ
*kakV- ‘carry on shoulder’	(?) kau- ‘carry on head or shoulder’
*tVk- ‘cut, cut off’	tuk- ‘chop’
*muk ‘blue’	muk
*mV(k,ŋ)V[C] + t(e,i)- ‘vomit’	mek (si-), mek ‘vomitus’
*ma(n,k,l)[a] ‘ground’	maɫ ‘ground, soil, world’
*nok ‘water’	noɫ
*ŋaŋ[a] ‘baby’	ŋaɫ ‘small baby’, ŋaŋa ‘male child’
*-i(t,l) ‘2DL verbal suffix’	-iɫ

To support his proto-Trans-New Guinea reconstructions, Pawley (2012) also cites probable reflexes in the Apali, Kalam, Kâte, Selepet, Binandere, Katei, Kiwai, Telefol, and Asmat languages.

== Semantics ==
=== Colors ===
Middle Wahgi distinguishes 14 color terms (from Evelyn Ramsey 1975):

- kuru ‘white, shades of off-white’
- nganimb ‘black’
- jipiɫ to- ‘be bluish-black’
- numb ‘nearly black; a plant used for dyeing string a dark grey’
- muk ‘true blue’
- manngiɫ ‘blue-green’
- kolnga ‘green; new; alive; raw, not fully cooked’
- balu ‘light brown, rust-coloured’
- bang ‘brown, red, orange, pink’
- galngin ‘brown’
- jilni ‘yellowish brown’
- bulni ‘yellow; yellow dye from a plant’ (overlapping with gi ni- ‘be yellow, bright’ and gispe kerem ‘yellow, yellow-orange’)

Middle Wahgi has three types of contrasting color patterns.

- pepe ‘striped’
- mon punduk pandil ni pa- ‘be spotted, speckled’
- ngingan ni sim ‘variegated colours, mottled’

=== Time ===
Middle Wahgi has at least a dozen words for days before or after, going far beyond ‘yesterday’ or ‘tomorrow’ (from Evelyn Ramsey 1975):

- pi, opi ‘today’
- toɫpa ‘tomorrow’
- taɫ ‘day after tomorrow’
- tolnge ‘yesterday’
- tolnge taɫ ‘day before yesterday’
- toi ‘4th day, i. e. 3 days from today’
- amb tupuɫɫ ‘5th day from today’
- yi tupuɫ ‘6th day from today’
- kinwaɫ ‘7th day from today’
- manwaɫ ‘8th day from today’
- moɫwaɫ ‘9th day from today’
- kialwaɫ ‘10th day from today’

== Dictionary ==
The first dictionary of Middle Wahgi was published by Church of the Nazarene medical missionary Evelyn Ramsey in 1975.
