= Voiced velar lateral affricate =

Consonantal sound represented by ⟨ɡʟ̝⟩ in IPA

ɡʟ̝

ɡ𝼄̬

Audio sample
- source · help
Image

A voiced velar lateral affricate is a type of consonantal sound, used in some spoken languages. The symbol in the International Phonetic Alphabet that represents this sound is ⟨ɡ͡ʟ̝⟩, though in extIPA ⟨ɡ͡𝼄̬⟩ is available. This consonant exists in the Hiw and Ekari languages.

== Features ==
Features of a voiced velar lateral affricate:

- Its manner of articulation is affricate, which means it is produced by first stopping the airflow entirely, then allowing air flow through a constricted channel at the place of articulation, causing turbulence.
- Its place of articulation is velar, which means it is articulated with the back of the tongue (the dorsum) at the soft palate.
- Its phonation is voiced, which means the vocal cords vibrate during the articulation.
- It is an oral consonant, which means that air is not allowed to escape through the nose.
- It is a lateral consonant, which means it is produced by directing the airstream over the sides of the tongue, rather than down the middle.
- Its airstream mechanism is pulmonic, which means it is articulated by pushing air only with the intercostal muscles and abdominal muscles, as in most sounds.

== Occurrence ==
Language	Word	IPA	Meaning	Notes
Ekari	dagi	[daɡ͡ʟ̝ĭ]	'head'	Before front vowels.
Hiw	qr̄ē	[kʷɡ͡ʟ̝ɪ]	'dolphin'	May be realized as an affricate [ɡʟ̝], prestopped [ᶢʟ], or a laterally released stop [ɡᶫ]. Contrasts with /r/ in recent loanwords.
Kanite	kala	[kaɡ͡ʟ̝a]	'dog'	May be realized as an affricate [ɡʟ̝] or a tap [ʟ̆].

== See also ==
- Index of phonetics articles

Place →	Labial					Coronal										Dorsal					Laryngeal			
Manner ↓	Bilabial		Labiodental		Linguolabial		Dental		Alveolar		Postalveolar		Retroflex		(Alveolo-)palatal		Velar		Uvular		Pharyngeal/epiglottal		Glottal	
Nasal	m̥	m	ɱ̊	ɱ		n̼	n̪̊	n̪	n̥	n	n̠̊	n̠	ɳ̊	ɳ	ɲ̊	ɲ	ŋ̊	ŋ	ɴ̥	ɴ				
Plosive	p	b	p̪	b̪	t̼	d̼	t̪	d̪	t	d			ʈ	ɖ	c	ɟ	k	ɡ	q	ɢ	ʡ		ʔ	
Sibilant affricate							t̪s̪	d̪z̪	ts	dz	t̠ʃ	d̠ʒ	tʂ	dʐ	tɕ	dʑ								
Non-sibilant affricate	pɸ	bβ	p̪f	b̪v			t̪θ	d̪ð	tɹ̝̊	dɹ̝	t̠ɹ̠̊˔	d̠ɹ̠˔			cç	ɟʝ	kx	ɡɣ	qχ	ɢʁ	ʡʜ	ʡʢ	ʔh	
Sibilant fricative							s̪	z̪	s	z	ʃ	ʒ	ʂ	ʐ	ɕ	ʑ								
Non-sibilant fricative	ɸ	β	f	v	θ̼	ð̼	θ	ð	θ̠	ð̠	ɹ̠̊˔	ɹ̠˔	ɻ̊˔	ɻ˔	ç	ʝ	x	ɣ	χ	ʁ	ħ	ʕ	h	ɦ
Approximant		β̞		ʋ				ð̞		ɹ		ɹ̠		ɻ		j		ɰ						˷
Tap/flap		ⱱ̟		ⱱ					ɾ̥	ɾ			ɽ̊	ɽ						ɢ̆		ʡ̮		
Trill	ʙ̥	ʙ							r̥	r		r̠	ɽ̊r̥	ɽr					ʀ̥	ʀ	ʜ	ʢ		
Lateral affricate									tɬ	dɮ			tꞎ	d𝼅	c𝼆	ɟʎ̝	k𝼄	ɡʟ̝						
Lateral fricative							ɬ̪		ɬ	ɮ			ꞎ	𝼅	𝼆	ʎ̝	𝼄	ʟ̝						
Lateral approximant								l̪	l̥	l		l̠	ɭ̊	ɭ	ʎ̥	ʎ	ʟ̥	ʟ		ʟ̠				
Lateral tap/flap									ɺ̥	ɺ			𝼈̊	𝼈		ʎ̮		ʟ̆						

		BL	LD	D	A	PA	RF	P	V	U
Implosive	Voiced	ɓ			ɗ		ᶑ	ʄ	ɠ	ʛ
Implosive	Voiceless	ɓ̥			ɗ̥		ᶑ̊	ʄ̊	ɠ̊	ʛ̥
Ejective	Stop	pʼ			tʼ		ʈʼ	cʼ	kʼ	qʼ
Ejective	Affricate		p̪fʼ	t̪θʼ	tsʼ	t̠ʃʼ	tʂʼ	tɕʼ	kxʼ	qχʼ
Ejective	Fricative	ɸʼ	fʼ	θʼ	sʼ	ʃʼ	ʂʼ	ɕʼ	xʼ	χʼ
Ejective	Lateral affricate				tɬʼ			c𝼆ʼ	k𝼄ʼ	q𝼄ʼ
Ejective	Lateral fricative				ɬʼ					
Click (top: velar; bottom: uvular)	Tenuis	kʘ qʘ		kǀ qǀ	kǃ qǃ		k𝼊 q𝼊	kǂ qǂ		
Click (top: velar; bottom: uvular)	Voiced	ɡʘ ɢʘ		ɡǀ ɢǀ	ɡǃ ɢǃ		ɡ𝼊 ɢ𝼊	ɡǂ ɢǂ		
Click (top: velar; bottom: uvular)	Nasal	ŋʘ ɴʘ		ŋǀ ɴǀ	ŋǃ ɴǃ		ŋ𝼊 ɴ𝼊	ŋǂ ɴǂ	ʞ	
Click (top: velar; bottom: uvular)	Tenuis lateral				kǁ qǁ					
Click (top: velar; bottom: uvular)	Voiced lateral				ɡǁ ɢǁ					
Click (top: velar; bottom: uvular)	Nasal lateral				ŋǁ ɴǁ					
