= Chimbu–Wahgi languages =

Language family

Chimbu–Wahgi
- Simbu – Western Highlands
- Geographic distribution: Papua New Guinea
- Linguistic classification: Trans–New Guinea or Papuan Gulf?: Central New Guinea Highlands; Chimbu–Wahgi
- Subdivisions: Chimbu; Hagen; Jimi; Wahgi

Language codes
- Glottolog: cent2120
- Map: The Chimbu–Wahgi languages of New Guinea Chimbu–Wahgi languages Trans–New Guinea languages Other Papuan languages Austronesian languages Uninhabited

The Chimbu–Wahgi languages are a language family of New Guinea. They are sometimes included in the Trans–New Guinea proposal; Usher links them with the Engan languages in a Central New Guinea Highlands family.

== Languages ==
There is little doubt that the Chimbu–Wahgi family is valid. The languages are:

- Chimbu–Wahgi family
  - Chimbu (Simbu) branch
    - Kuman (Chimbu)
    - Chuave
    - Nomane
    - Golin–Dom
    - Salt-Yui
    - Sinasina
  - Western Highlands
    - Jimi River
      - Maring
      - Narak–Kandawo
    - Wahgi Valley
      - Nii
      - Wahgi
      - North Wahgi (= Yu We?)
    - Mount Hagen
      - Melpa (Medlpa)
      - Kaugel River
        - Imbo Ungu
        - Umbu-Ungu
        - Mbo-Ung (Bo-Ung)

== Phonology ==
Several of the Chimbu–Wahgi languages, such as Nii, Wahgi, and Kuman, have uncommon lateral consonants.

Chimbu–Wahgi languages have contrastive tone.

== Pronouns ==
The singular pronouns are:

	sg
1	*ná
2	*nim
3	*[y]é

Dual *-l and plural *-n reflect Trans–New Guinea forms.

== Evolution ==
Middle Wahgi reflexes of proto-Trans-New Guinea (pTNG) etyma:

- ama ‘mother’ < *am(a,i)
- amu ‘breast’ < *amu
- numan ‘louse’ < *niman
- numan ‘thought, mind, will’ < *n(o,u)
- man, muŋ ‘fruit, nut, lump’
- muŋgum ‘kidney’ < *maŋgV ‘round object’
- mundmuŋ ‘heart’ < *mundun-maŋgV
- mokum, mokem ‘knuckle, joint’ < *mo(k,ŋg)Vm ‘joint’
- mundun mo- ‘be pot bellied’ < *mundun ‘internal organs, belly’
- ŋaŋ ‘small male child’ < *ŋaŋ[a] ‘baby’
- apa- ‘maternal uncle’ < *apa ‘father’
- embe(m) ‘name’ < *imbi ‘name’
- muk ‘blue’ < *muk
- tuk- ‘chop’ < *tVk- ‘cut, cut off’
- no- ‘eat’ < *na-
- mek si- ‘to vomit’
- mek ‘vomitus’ < *makV[C] + t(e,i)- ‘to vomit’
