= Voiced velar lateral approximant =

Consonantal sound represented by ⟨ʟ⟩ in IPA

ʟ
- IPA number: 158

Audio sample
- source · help

Encoding
- Entity (decimal): &#671;
- Unicode (hex): U+029F
- X-SAMPA: L\
- Braille: ⠔ (braille pattern dots-35) ⠇ (braille pattern dots-123)
Image

Voiced velar lateral tap

ʟ̆

ʟ̮

Audio sample
- source · help

Encoding
- X-SAMPA: L\_X

Voiced uvular lateral approximant

ʟ̠
- IPA number: 158 414

Audio sample
- source · help

Encoding
- X-SAMPA: L\_-

A voiced velar lateral approximant is a type of consonantal sound, used as a distinct consonant in a very small number of spoken languages in the world. The symbol in the International Phonetic Alphabet that has represented this sound since 1989 is ⟨ʟ⟩, a small capital letter l.

Velar laterals often involve a prestopped realization [ᶢʟ].

According to Ladefoged & Maddieson (1996), the extremely short duration of /ʟ/ in intervocalic position (20–30 ms) in some of the languages in New Guinea, such as Kanite and Melpa, warrants calling it a voiced velar lateral tap. The IPA has no specific symbol for this sound, but it may be represented with a breve for extra-short, such as ⟨ʟ̆⟩, to indicate a tapped consonant.

It is reported that some dialects of English may have a voiced uvular lateral approximant, which can be represented in the IPA as ⟨ʟ̠⟩ (a retracted ⟨ʟ⟩), though evidence of this consonant is limited.

== Features ==
Features of a voiced velar lateral approximant:

- Its manner of articulation is approximant, which means it is produced by narrowing the vocal tract at the place of articulation, but not enough to produce a turbulent airstream.
- Its place of articulation is velar, which means it is articulated with the back of the tongue (the dorsum) at the soft palate.
- Its phonation is voiced, which means the vocal cords vibrate during the articulation.
- It is an oral consonant, which means that air is not allowed to escape through the nose.
- It is a lateral consonant, which means it is produced by directing the airstream over the sides of the tongue, rather than down the middle.
- Its airstream mechanism is pulmonic, which means it is articulated by pushing air only with the intercostal muscles and abdominal muscles, as in most speech sounds.

A velar lateral [ʟ] involves no contact of the tip of the tongue with the roof of the mouth: just like for a velar stop [ɡ], the only contact takes place between the back of the tongue and the velum. This contrasts with a velarized alveolar lateral approximant [ɫ] – also known as the dark l in English feel [fiːɫ] – for which the apex touches the alveolar ridge.

== Occurrence ==
=== Velar ===
Language		Word	IPA	Meaning	Notes
English	Southern US	middle	[ˈmɪɾʟ̩]	'middle'	May occur before or after a velar consonant, as in milk and cycle, when assimilating /ʊ/, as in wolf, or before labial consonants, as in help. More often realized as [ɫ]. See English phonology
English	Southern US	full	[ˈfʟ̩ː]	'full'	May occur before or after a velar consonant, as in milk and cycle, when assimilating /ʊ/, as in wolf, or before labial consonants, as in help. More often realized as [ɫ]. See English phonology
Hiw		r̄evr̄ov	[ɡ͡ʟəβˈɡ͡ʟɔβ]	'evening'	May be realized as prestopped [ᶢʟ], affricate [ɡʟ̝], or laterally released stop [ɡᶫ].
Kanite		kala	[kaʟ̆a]	'dog'	May be realized as an affricate [ɡʟ̝] or a tap [ʟ̆].
Melpa		paⱡa	[paᶢʟa]	'fence'	May be realized as prestopped [ᶢʟ] or tapped [ʟ̆].
Mid-Wahgi		aglagle	[aʟaʟe]	'dizzy'	May be realized as prestopped [ᶢʟ].

=== Uvular ===
Language		Word	IPA	Meaning	Notes
English	Some American speakers	wool	[wʊʟ̠]	'wool'	May be velar or simply alveolar instead. See English phonology.

== See also ==
- Voiceless velar lateral approximant, [ʟ̥]
- Velarized alveolar lateral approximant, [ɫ]
- Voiceless alveolar lateral fricative, [ɬ]
- Voiced velar lateral fricative, [ʟ̝]
- Voiceless velar lateral fricative, [ʟ̝̊] or extIPA [𝼄]
- Index of phonetics articles

== Notes ==
Place →	Labial					Coronal										Dorsal					Laryngeal			
Manner ↓	Bilabial		Labiodental		Linguolabial		Dental		Alveolar		Postalveolar		Retroflex		(Alveolo-)palatal		Velar		Uvular		Pharyngeal/epiglottal		Glottal	
Nasal	m̥	m	ɱ̊	ɱ		n̼	n̪̊	n̪	n̥	n	n̠̊	n̠	ɳ̊	ɳ	ɲ̊	ɲ	ŋ̊	ŋ	ɴ̥	ɴ				
Plosive	p	b	p̪	b̪	t̼	d̼	t̪	d̪	t	d			ʈ	ɖ	c	ɟ	k	ɡ	q	ɢ	ʡ		ʔ	
Sibilant affricate							t̪s̪	d̪z̪	ts	dz	t̠ʃ	d̠ʒ	tʂ	dʐ	tɕ	dʑ								
Non-sibilant affricate	pɸ	bβ	p̪f	b̪v			t̪θ	d̪ð	tɹ̝̊	dɹ̝	t̠ɹ̠̊˔	d̠ɹ̠˔			cç	ɟʝ	kx	ɡɣ	qχ	ɢʁ	ʡʜ	ʡʢ	ʔh	
Sibilant fricative							s̪	z̪	s	z	ʃ	ʒ	ʂ	ʐ	ɕ	ʑ								
Non-sibilant fricative	ɸ	β	f	v	θ̼	ð̼	θ	ð	θ̠	ð̠	ɹ̠̊˔	ɹ̠˔	ɻ̊˔	ɻ˔	ç	ʝ	x	ɣ	χ	ʁ	ħ	ʕ	h	ɦ
Approximant		β̞		ʋ				ð̞		ɹ		ɹ̠		ɻ		j		ɰ						˷
Tap/flap		ⱱ̟		ⱱ					ɾ̥	ɾ			ɽ̊	ɽ						ɢ̆		ʡ̆		
Trill	ʙ̥	ʙ							r̥	r		r̠	ɽ̊r̥	ɽr					ʀ̥	ʀ	ʜ	ʢ		
Lateral affricate									tɬ	dɮ			tꞎ	d𝼅	c𝼆	ɟʎ̝	k𝼄	ɡʟ̝						
Lateral fricative							ɬ̪		ɬ	ɮ			ꞎ	𝼅	𝼆	ʎ̝	𝼄	ʟ̝						
Lateral approximant								l̪	l̥	l		l̠	ɭ̊	ɭ	ʎ̥	ʎ	ʟ̥	ʟ		ʟ̠				
Lateral tap/flap									ɺ̥	ɺ			𝼈̊	𝼈		ʎ̆		ʟ̆						

		BL	LD	D	A	PA	RF	P	V	U
Implosive	Voiced	ɓ			ɗ		ᶑ	ʄ	ɠ	ʛ
Implosive	Voiceless	ɓ̥			ɗ̥		ᶑ̊	ʄ̊	ɠ̊	ʛ̥
Ejective	Stop	pʼ			tʼ		ʈʼ	cʼ	kʼ	qʼ
Ejective	Affricate		p̪fʼ	tθʼ	tsʼ	tʃʼ	tʂʼ	tɕʼ	kxʼ	qχʼ
Ejective	Fricative	ɸʼ	fʼ	θʼ	sʼ	ʃʼ	ʂʼ	ɕʼ	xʼ	χʼ
Ejective	Lateral affricate				tɬʼ			c𝼆ʼ	k𝼄ʼ	q𝼄ʼ
Ejective	Lateral fricative				ɬʼ					
Click (top: velar; bottom: uvular)	Tenuis	kʘ qʘ		kǀ qǀ	kǃ qǃ		k𝼊 q𝼊	kǂ qǂ		
Click (top: velar; bottom: uvular)	Voiced	ɡʘ ɢʘ		ɡǀ ɢǀ	ɡǃ ɢǃ		ɡ𝼊 ɢ𝼊	ɡǂ ɢǂ		
Click (top: velar; bottom: uvular)	Nasal	ŋʘ ɴʘ		ŋǀ ɴǀ	ŋǃ ɴǃ		ŋ𝼊 ɴ𝼊	ŋǂ ɴǂ	ʞ	
Click (top: velar; bottom: uvular)	Tenuis lateral				kǁ qǁ					
Click (top: velar; bottom: uvular)	Voiced lateral				ɡǁ ɢǁ					
Click (top: velar; bottom: uvular)	Nasal lateral				ŋǁ ɴǁ					
