= List of grammatical cases =

This is a list of grammatical cases as they are used by various inflectional languages that have declension.

This list will mark the case, when it is used, an example of it, and then finally what language(s) the case is used in.

== Location and movement ==
Note: Most cases used for location and motion can be used for time as well.

=== Location ===
Case	Usage	Example	Found in
Adessive case	close	near/at/by the house	Estonian | Finnish | Hungarian | Lezgian | Lithuanian | Livonian | Tlingit | Tsez | Kven
Antessive case	anterior	before the house	Dravidian languages
Apudessive case	adjacent	next to the house	Tsez
Inessive case	inside	inside the house	Basque | Erzya | Estonian | Lithuanian | Finnish | Hungarian | Ossetic | Tsez | Kven
Intrative case	between	between the houses	Limbu | Quechua
Locative case	location	at/on/in the house	Armenian (Eastern) | Azeri | Bengali | Belarusian | Bosnian | Chuvash | Croatian | Czech | Gujarati | Hungarian | Inari Sámi | Inuktitut | Japanese | Kashmiri | Latin (restricted) | Latvian | Lithuanian | Manchu | Northern Sámi | Polish | Quechua | Russian | Sanskrit | Serbian | Skolt Sámi | Slovak | Slovene | Sorbian | Tamil | Telugu | Tlingit | Turkish | Ukrainian | Uzbek (Note: the case in Slavic languages termed the "locative case" in English is actually a prepositional case.)
Pergressive case	vicinity	in the vicinity of the house	Kamu
Pertingent case	contacting	touching the house	Tlingit | Archi
Postessive case	posterior	after the house	Lezgian | Agul
Subessive case	under	under/below the house	Tsez
Superessive case	on the surface	on (top of) the house	Hungarian | Ossetic | Tsez | Finnish

=== Motion from ===
Case	Usage	Example	Found in
Ablative case	near or inside	away from the house	Albanian | Armenian (Eastern) | Armenian (Western) | Azeri | Chuvash | Erzya | Estonian | Evenki | Finnish | Hungarian | Inuktitut | Japanese | Latin | Manchu | Ossetic | Quechua | Tamil | Sanskrit | Tibetan | Tlingit | Tsez | Turkish | Uzbek | Yukaghir
Adelative case	the vicinity	from near the house	Lezgian
Delative case	the surface	from (the top of) the house	Hungarian | Finnish
Egressive case	marking the beginning of a movement or time	beginning from the house	Udmurt
Elative case	the interior	out of the house	Erzya | Estonian | Evenki | Finnish | Hungarian | Kven
Postelative case	movement from behind	from behind the house	Lezgian

=== Motion to ===
Case	Usage	Example	Found in
Allative case	in Hungarian and in Finnish: the adjacency in Estonian and in Finnish: the surface	to the house onto the house	Erzya | Estonian | Finnish | Hungarian | Inuktitut | Japanese | Kashmiri | Kven | Lithuanian | Tamil | Tlingit | Tsez | Turkish | Tuvan | Uzbek |
Illative case	inside	into the house	Erzya | Estonian | Finnish | Hungarian | Inari Sámi | Lithuanian | Northern Sámi | Skolt Sámi | Tamil | Tsez | Kven
Lative case	near or inside	to/into the house	Erzya | Finnish | Quechua | Tsez | Turkish
Sublative case	the surface or below	on(to) the house/under the house	Hungarian | Tsez | Finnish
Superlative case	the top	on(to) the house/on top of the house	Northeast Caucasian languages: Bezhta | Hinuq | Tsez
Terminative case	marking the end of a movement or time	as far as the house	Chuvash | Estonian | Hungarian | Japanese | Quechua

=== Motion via ===
Case	Usage	Example	Found in
Perlative case	movement through or along	through/along the house	Evenki | Tocharian A & B | Warlpiri | Yankunytjatjara
Prolative case (= prosecutive case, vialis case)	movement using a surface or way	by way of/through the house	Erzya | Estonian (rare) | Finnish (rare) | Tlingit | Greenlandic | Inuktitut

=== Time ===
Case	Usage	Example	Found in
Ablative case	specifying a time when and within	E.g.: eō tempore, "at that time"; paucīs hōrīs, "within a few hours".	Latin | Armenian (Eastern) | Armenian (Western) | Finnish | Turkish | Kven
Accusative case	indicating duration of time known as the accusative of duration of time	E.g.: multos annos, "for many years"; ducentos annos, "for 200 years".	Latin | German | Esperanto | Serbian | Croatian | Russian | Turkish
Essive case	used for specifying days and dates	E.g.: maanantaina, "on Monday"; kuudentena joulukuuta, "on the 6th of December".	Finnish | Estonian | Kven
Limitative case	specifying a deadline	E.g.: 午後5時半までに (Gogo go-ji han made-ni) "by 5:30 PM"	Japanese
Temporal case	specifying a time	E.g.: hétkor "at seven" or hét órakor "at seven o'clock"; éjfélkor "at midnight"; karácsonykor "at Christmas".	Hungarian | Finnish (rare)

=== Chart for review for the basic cases ===
	interior	surface	adjacency	state
from	Elative	Delative	Ablative	Exessive
at/in	Inessive	Superessive	Adessive	Essive
(in)to	Illative	Sublative	Allative	Translative
via	Perlative	Prolative		

== Morphosyntactic alignment ==
For meanings of the terms agent, patient, experiencer, and instrument, see thematic relation.

Case	Usage	Example	Found in
Absolutive case (1)	patient, experiencer; subject of an intransitive verb and direct object of a transitive verb	he pushed the door and it opened	Basque | Tibetan
Absolutive case (2)	patient, involuntary experiencer	he pushed the door and it opened; he slipped	active-stative languages
Absolutive case (3)	patient; experiencer; instrument	he pushed the door with his hand and it opened	Inuktitut
Accusative case (1)	patient	he pushed the door and it opened	Akkadian | Albanian | Arabic | Armenian (Eastern) | Armenian (Western) | Azeri | Bosnian | Croatian | Czech | Erzya | Esperanto | Faroese | Finnish | German | Greek | Hungarian | Icelandic | Inari Sámi | Japanese | Latin | Latvian | Lithuanian | Northern Sámi | Polish | Romanian | Russian | Sanskrit | Serbian | Skolt Sámi | Slovak | Slovene | Ukrainian | Georgian | Yiddish
Accusative case (2)	direct object of a transitive verb; made from; about; for a time	I see her	Inuktitut | Persian | Turkish | Serbo-Croatian
Agentive case	agent, specifies or asks about who or what; specific agent that is subset of a general topic or subject	it was she who committed the crime; as for him, his head hurts	Japanese, Mongsen Ao
Direct case	direct subject or object of a transitive or intransitive verb	I saw her; I gave her the book.	Scottish Gaelic | many languages with Austronesian Alignment.
Ergative case	agent; subject of a transitive verb	he pushed the door and it opened	Basque | Chechen | Dyirbal | Georgian | Kashmiri | Samoan | Tibetan | Tlingit | Tsez
Ergative-genitive case	agent, possession	he pushed the door and it opened; her dog	Classic Maya | Inuktitut
Instructive	means, answers question how?	by means of the house	Estonian (rare) | Finnish
Instrumental	instrument, answers question using what?	with the house	Armenian (Eastern) | Armenian (Western) | Belarusian | Bosnian | Croatian | Czech | Evenki | Georgian | Japanese | Kashmiri | Latvian | Lithuanian | Polish | Russian | Sanskrit | Serbian | Slovak | Slovene | Tsez | Ukrainian | Yukaghir
Instrumental-comitative case	instrument, in company	with the house	Chuvash | Hungarian | Tlingit
Nominative case (1)	agent, experiencer; subject of a transitive or intransitive verb	he pushed the door and it opened	nominative–accusative languages (including marked nominative languages)
Nominative case (2)	agent; voluntary experiencer	he pushed the door and it opened; she paused	active languages
Objective case (1)	direct or indirect object of verb	I saw her; I gave her the book.	Bengali | Chuvash
Objective/Oblique (2)	direct or indirect object of verb or object of preposition; a catch-all case for any situation except nominative or genitive	I saw her; I gave her the book; with her.	English | Swedish | Danish | Norwegian | Bulgarian
Oblique case	all-round case; any situation except nominative or vocative	concerning the house	Anglo-Norman | Hindi | Old French | Old Provençal | Telugu | Tibetan
Intransitive case (also called passive or patient case)	the subject of an intransitive verb or the logical complement of a transitive verb	The door opened	languages of the Caucasus | Ainu
Pegative case	agent in a clause with a dative argument	he gave the book to him	Azoyú Tlapanec

== Relation ==
Case	Usage	Example	Found in
Ablative case	all-round indirect case	concerning the house	Albanian | Armenian (Eastern) | Armenian (Western) | Sanskrit | Inuktitut | Kashmiri | Latin | Lithuanian | Finnish
Aversive case	avoiding or fear	avoiding the house	Warlpiri | Yidiny
Benefactive case	for, for the benefit of, intended for	for the house	Basque | Quechua | Telugu | Tamil
Caritative case	because of presence or absence	for want of a house	Ngiyambaa
Causal case	because, because of	because of the house	Quechua | Telugu
Causal-final case	efficient or final cause	for a house	Chuvash | Hungarian
Comitative case	accompanied with	with the house	Dumi | Ingush | Estonian | Finnish (rare) | Inari Sámi | Japanese | Kashmiri | Kven | Northern Sámi | Skolt Sámi | Ossetic (only in Iron) | Tibetan
Dative case	shows direction or recipient	for/to the house	Albanian | Armenian (Eastern) | Armenian (Western) | Azeri | Belarusian | Bosnian | Croatian | Czech | Erzya | Faroese | Georgian | German | Ancient Greek | Hindi | Hungarian | Icelandic | Inuktitut | Japanese | Kashmiri | Latin | Latvian | Lithuanian | Manchu | Ossetic | Polish | Romanian | Russian | Sanskrit | Scottish Gaelic^{†} | Serbian | Slovak | Slovene | Tsez | Turkish | Ukrainian | Yiddish^† The case classically referred to as dative in Scottish Gaelic has shifted to, and is sometimes called, a prepositional case.
Distributive case	distribution by piece	per house	Chuvash | Hungarian | Finnish
Distributive-temporal case	frequency	daily; on Sundays	Hungarian; Finnish
Genitive case	shows generic relationship, generally ownership, but also composition, reference, description, etc.	of the house; the house's	Akkadian | Albanian | Arabic | Armenian (Eastern) | Armenian (Western) | Azeri | Bengali | Belarusian | Bosnian | Chuvash | Croatian | Czech | Danish | Dutch | English | Erzya | Estonian | Faroese | Finnish | Georgian | German | Greek | Hungarian | Icelandic | Inari Sámi | Irish | Japanese | Kashmiri | Latin | Latvian | Lithuanian | Manchu | Northern Sámi | Norwegian | Persian | Polish | Romanian | Russian | Sanskrit | Scottish Gaelic | Serbian | Skolt Sámi | Slovak | Slovene | Swedish | Tibetan | Tsez | Turkish | Ukrainian | Kven
Ornative case	endowment	equipped with a house	Dumi; Hungarian
Possessed case	passive possession	the house is owned	Tlingit | Turkish^{†}^†A sentence with possessed case noun always has to include a possessive case noun.
Possessive case	direct ownership	owned by the house	English | Turkish
Privative case	lacking, without	without a house	Chuvash | Kamu | Martuthunira | Wagiman
Semblative/Similative case	similarity, comparing	that tree is like a house	Wagiman
Sociative case	along with, together with	(together) with the house	Hungarian | Ossetic
Substitutive case	substituting, instead of	instead of him	Archi

== Semantics ==
Case	Usage	Example	Found in
Partitive case	used for amounts	three (of the) houses	Estonian | Finnish | Inari Sámi | Russian | Skolt Sámi | Kven
Prepositional case	when adpositions modify the noun	in/on/about the house	Belarusian^{†} | Czech^{†} | Polish^{†} | Russian | Scottish Gaelic^{‡} | Slovak^{†} | Ukrainian^{†}^† This case is called lokál in Czech and Slovak, miejscownik in Polish, місцевий (miscevý) in Ukrainian and месны (miesny) in Belarusian; these names imply that this case also covers locative case.^‡ The prepositional case in Scottish Gaelic is classically referred to as a dative case.
Vocative case	used for addressing, with or without a preposition	Hey, father! O father! Father!	Albanian (rare) | Belarusian (rare) | Bulgarian | Bosnian | Croatian | Czech | Georgian | Greek | Hindi | Irish | Japanese (literary or poetic) | Scottish Gaelic | Manx | Itelmen | Kashmiri | Ket | Latin | Latvian | Lithuanian | Macedonian | Nivkh | Polish | Romanian | Russian (rare) | Sanskrit | Scottish Gaelic | Serbian | Slovak (rare) | Telugu | Ukrainian | Nahuatl

== State ==
Case	Usage	Example	Found in
Abessive case	lacking	without the house	Erzya | Estonian | Finnish | Inari Sámi | Skolt Sámi | Quechua | Kven
Adverbial case	temporary state	as a house	Georgian | Udmurt | Finnic languages | Abkhaz
Comparative case	comparison	like the house	Dumi | Mari | Nivkh
Equative case	similarity	similar to the house	Greenlandic | Ossetic | Sumerian | Tlingit | Tsez
Essive case	temporary state of being	as the house	Estonian | Finnish | Inari Sámi | Inuktitut | Middle Egyptian | Northern Sámi | Skolt Sámi | Tsez
Essive-formal case	marking a condition as a quality (a kind of shape)	as a house	Hungarian
Essive-modal case	marking a condition as a quality (a way of being)	as a house	Hungarian
Exessive case	marking a transition from a condition	from being a house (i.e., it stops being a house)	Estonian (rare) | Finnish (dialectal)
Formal case	marking a condition as a quality	as a house	Hungarian
Orientative case	positive orientation	turned towards the house	Chukchi
Revertive case	negative orientation	against the house	Manchu
Translative case	change of a condition into another	(turning) into a house	Erzya | Estonian | Finnish | Hungarian | Japanese | Khanty | Kven
