= Hindustani grammar =

Grammatical features of the Hindustani lingua franca

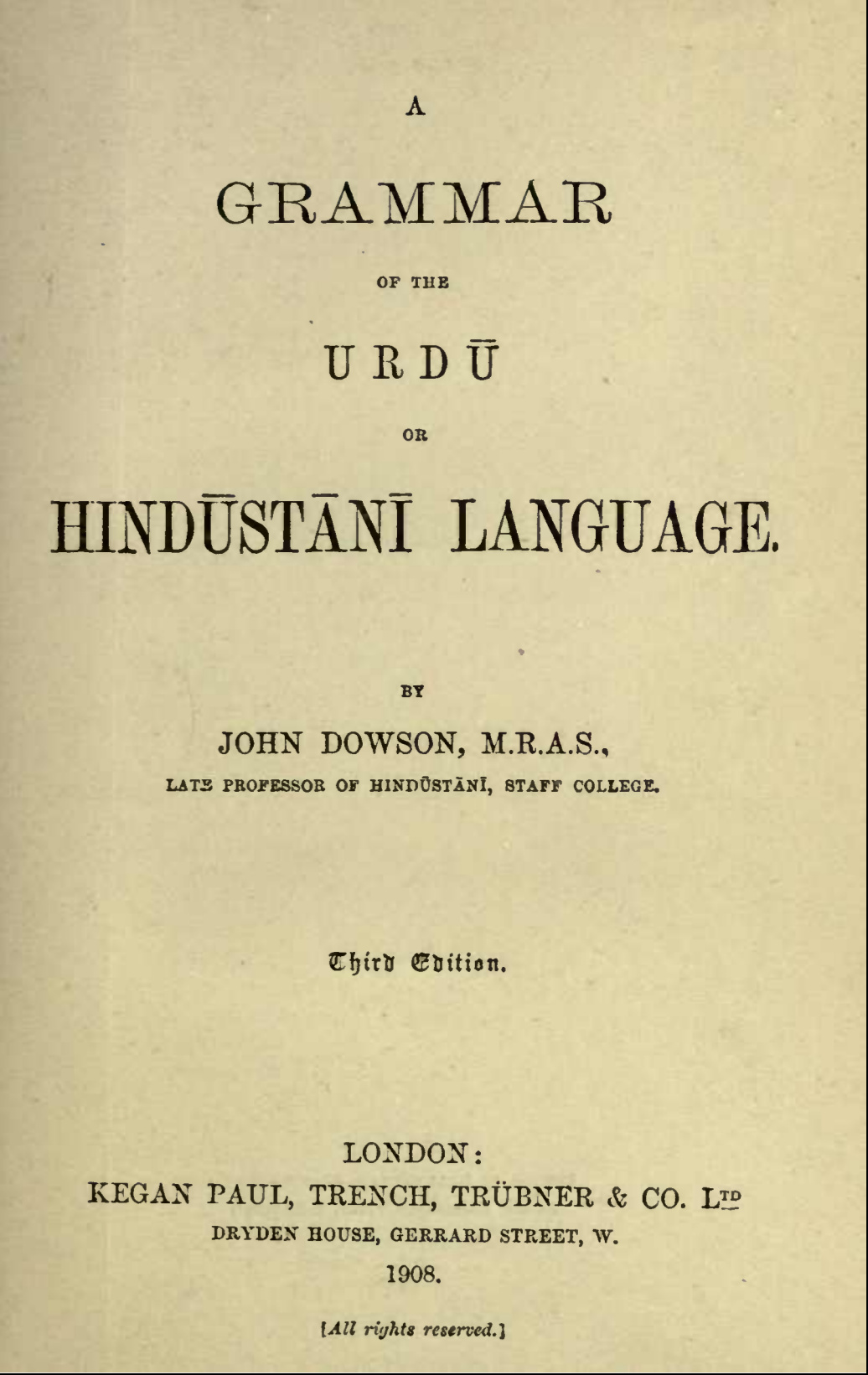
Cover page of A Grammar of the Urdu or Hindustani Language

Hindustani, the lingua franca of northern India and Pakistan, has two standardised registers: Hindi and Urdu. Grammatical differences between the two standards are minor but each uses its own script: Hindi uses Devanagari while Urdu uses an extended form of the Perso-Arabic script, typically in the Nastaʿlīq style.

On this grammar page, Hindustani is written in the transcription outlined in Masica (1991). Being "primarily a system of transliteration from the Indian scripts, [and] based in turn upon Sanskrit" (cf. ISO, IAST), these are its salient features: subscript dots for retroflex consonants; macrons for etymologically contrastive long vowels; h for aspirated plosives; and tildes for nasalised vowels.

== Phonology ==
The sounds presented in parentheses in the tables below signify they are only found in loanwords from either Persian, Arabic or Sanskrit. More information about phonology of Hindustani can be read on Hindustani phonology and IPA/Hindi and Urdu.

=== Vowels ===
Hindustani natively possesses a symmetrical ten-vowel system. The vowels [ə], [ɪ], [ʊ] are always short in length, while the vowels [ɑː], [iː], [uː], [eː], [oː], [ɛː], [ɔː] are always considered long, in addition to an eleventh vowel /æː/ which is found in English loanwords.

Vowels in Hindustani
	Front								Central				Back							
	long				short				Central				short				long			
	IPA	Rom.	script		IPA	Rom.	script		IPA	Rom.	script		IPA	Rom.	script		IPA	Rom.	script	
Close	iː	ī	ई	اِیْ	ɪ	i	इ	اِ					ʊ	u	उ	اُ	uː	ū	ऊ	اُوْ
Close-mid	eː	e	ए	اِےْ													oː	o	ओ	اُوْ
Open-mid	ɛː	ai	ऐ	اَےْ	(ɛ)	ê	ऍ	اْ	ə	a	अ	اَ	(ɔ)	ô	ऑ		ɔː	au	औ	اَوْ
Open	(æː)	æ	ऐ	اَےْ													ɑː	ā	आ	آ

==== Vowel [ɛ] and [ɔ] ====
[ɛ] occurs as a conditional allophone of /ə/ (schwa) in proximity to /ɦ/, if and only if the /ɦ/ is surrounded on both sides by two schwas. and is realised as separate vowel. For example, in kahanā /kəɦ(ə)naː/ (कहना – کَہنا 'to say'), the /ɦ/ is surrounded on both sides by schwa, hence both the schwas will become fronted to short [ɛ], giving the pronunciation [kɛɦɛnaː]. Syncopation of phonemic middle schwa can further occur to give [kɛɦ.naː].

Similarly, [ɔ] occurs as a conditional allophone of /ə/ and /ʊ/ in proximity to /ɦ/, specifically when they occur in the sequence /əɦʊ/, pronounced [ɔɦɔ]. For example, the word bahut /bəɦʊt/ (बहुत – بہت 'many') is pronounced [bɔɦɔt].

=== Consonants ===
Hindustani has a core set of 28 consonants inherited from earlier Indo-Aryan. Supplementing these are two consonants that are internal developments in specific word-medial contexts, and seven consonants originally found in loan words, whose expression is dependent on factors such as status (class, education, etc.) and cultural register (Modern Standard Hindi vs Urdu).

==== Allophony of [v] and [w] ====
[v] and [w] are allophones in Hindustani. These are distinct phonemes in English, but both are allophones of the phoneme /ʋ/ in Hindustani (written ⟨व⟩ in Hindi or ⟨و⟩ in Urdu), including loanwords of Arabic and Persian origin. More specifically, they are conditional allophones, i.e. rules apply on whether ⟨व⟩ is pronounced as [v] or [w] depending on context. Native Hindi speakers pronounce ⟨व⟩ as [v] in vrat (व्रत – ورت, 'vow') and [w] in pakwān (पकवान – پکوان 'food dish'), treating them as a single phoneme and without being aware of the allophonic distinctions, though these are apparent to native English speakers. The rule is that the consonant is pronounced as semivowel [w] in onglide position, i.e. between an onset consonant and a following vowel.

Consonants and vowels are outlined in the table below. Hovering the mouse cursor over them will reveal the appropriate IPA information, while in the rest of the article hovering the mouse cursor over underlined forms will reveal the appropriate English translation.

Consonants in Hindustani
		Labial				Dental / Alveolar				Retroflex				Palatal				Velar				Uvular				Glottal			
		IPA	Rom.	script		IPA	Rom.	script		IPA	Rom.	script		IPA	Rom.	script		IPA	Rom.	script		IPA	Rom.	script		IPA	Rom.	script	
Nasal		m	m	म	م	n	n	न	ن	ɳ	ṇ	ण	ݨ	(ɲ)	ñ	ञ	نیْ	ŋ	ṅ	ङ	ن٘گ								
Plosive and affricate	voiceless	p	p	प	پ	t	t	त	ت	ʈ	ṭ	ट	ٹ	tʃ	c	च	چ	k	k	क	ک	(q)	q	क़	ق				
Plosive and affricate	voiceless aspirated	pʰ	ph	फ	پھ	tʰ	th	थ	تھ	ʈʰ	ṭh	ठ	ٹھ	tʃʰ	ch	छ	چھ	kʰ	kh	ख	کھ								
Plosive and affricate	voiced	b	b	ब	ب	d	d	द	د	ɖ	ḍ	ड	ڈ	dʒ	j	ज	ج	ɡ	g	ग	گ								
Plosive and affricate	voiced aspirated	bʱ	bh	भ	بھ	dʱ	dh	ध	دھ	ɖʱ	ḍh	ढ	ڈھ	dʒʱ	jh	झ	جھ	ɡʱ	gh	घ	گھ								
Flap and trill	voiced trill					r	r / rr	र / र्र	ر/ رّ	ɽ	ṛ	ड़	ڑ																
Flap and trill	voiced trill aspirated									ɽʱ	ṛh	ढ़	ڑھ																
Flap and trill	voiced tap					ɾ	r	र	ر																				
Fricative	voiceless	f	f	फ़	ف	s	s	स	س	(ʂ)	ṣ	ष	شؕ	ʃ	ś	श	ش	(x)	x	ख़	خ					ɦ	h	ह	ہ
Fricative	voiced	ʋ~w	v / w	व	و	z	z	ज़	ز					(ʒ)	ź	झ़	ژ	(ɣ)	ġ	ग़	غ					ɦ	h	ह	ہ
Approximant		ʋ~w	v / w	व	و	l	l	ल	ل					j	y	य	ی									ɦ	h	ह	ہ

== Morphology ==
=== Nouns ===
Hindustani distinguishes two genders (masculine and feminine), two noun types (count and non-count), two numbers (singular and plural), and three cases (nominative, oblique, and vocative). Nouns may be further divided into three classes based on declension, called type-I, type-II, and type-III. The basic difference between the three categories is that the first two have characteristic terminations in the nominative singular while the third does not.

The table below displays the suffix paradigms. A hyphen symbol (for the marked type-I) denotes change from the original termination to another (for example laṛkā to laṛke in the masculine singular oblique), whereas a plus sign (for the unmarked type-II) denotes an ending which should be added (seb to sebõ in the masculine plural oblique). -∅ denotes that no suffix is added to the noun stem. The next table of noun declensions shows the above noun case paradigms in action.

		Singular			Plural			Translation
		Nominative	Oblique	Vocative	Nominative	Oblique	Vocative	Translation
m.	I	-ā laṛkā	-e laṛke		-e laṛke	-õ laṛkõ	-o laṛko	boy
m.	II	-ī ādmī				-iyõ ādmiyõ	-iyo ādmiyo	man
m.	II	-ū cāqū				-uõ cāquõ	-uo cāquo	knife
m.	III	-∅ seb				+õ sebõ	+o sebo	apple
f.	I	-ī, -i, -iyā laṛkī			-iyā̃ laṛkīyā̃	-iyõ laṛkīyõ	-iyo laṛkīyo	girl
f.	II	-∅ bhāṣā			+ẽ bhāṣāẽ	+õ bhāṣāõ	+o bhāṣāo	language

Notes:

1. The semi-consonant -y- is added after the noun stem before adding the declension suffix in the plural declension when the noun stem ends in a vowel.
2. A small number of marked masculine nouns like kuā̃ display nasalization of all terminations.
3. Some masculine nouns (which refer to family relations) ending in -ā do not change in the nominative plural and fall in the unmarked category. i.e. pāpā "father", cācā "uncle", rājā "king".
4. Unmarked nouns ending in -ū and -ī generally shorten this to -u and -i before the oblique (and vocative) plural terminations, with the latter also inserting the semivowel y.
5. Many feminine Sanskrit loanwords such as bhāṣā ('language') and mātā (mother) end in -ā, therefore the ending -ā is not always a reliable indicator of noun gender.
6. In Urdu, many Arabic words may retain their original dual and plural markings. i.e. vālid "father" → vālidain "parents".
7. The -iyā ending is also not always a reliable indicator of gender or noun type.
  Some words such as pahiyā ('wheel') and Persian takiyā ('pillow') are masculine type-I: pahiye ('wheels'), takiye ('pillows').
  Feminine loanwords such as Arabic duniyā ('world') and Sanskrit kriyā ('action') use feminine type-II endings: duniyāẽ ('worlds'), kriyāẽ ('actions').
8. Perso-Arabic loans ending in final unpronounced -h are handled as masculine marked nouns. Hence bacca(h) → baccā. The former is the Urdu spelling, the latter the Hindi. The pronunciation is baccā in both cases.

=== Adjectives ===
Adjectives may be divided into declinable and indeclinable categories. Declinables are marked, through termination, for the gender, number, case of the nouns they qualify. The set of declinable adjective terminations is similar but greatly simplified in comparison to that of noun terminations. Indeclinable adjectives are completely invariable, and can end in either consonants or vowels (including ā and ī). A number of declinables display nasalisation of all terminations. Nominative masculine singular form (-ā) is the citation form.

All adjectives can be used either attributively, predicatively, or substantively. Substantively they are declined as nouns rather than adjectives. The semblative postposition sā is used with adjectives for modifying or lightening their meaning; giving them an "-ish", "-esque", "like", or "quite" sense. e.g. nīlā "blue" → nīlā sā "bluish". Its emphasis is rather ambiguous, sometimes enhancing, sometimes toning down, the sense of the adjective.

			Singular			Plural			Translation
			Nominative	Oblique	Vocative	Nominative	Oblique	Vocative	Translation
Declinable	I	m.	-ā acchā	-e acche					good
Declinable	I	f.	-ī acchī						good
Declinable	II	m.	-yā̃ dāyā̃	-yẽ dāyẽ					right (direction)
Declinable	II	f.	-yī̃ dāyī̃						right (direction)
Indeclinable			-∅ lāl						red

- Examples of declinable (type-I) adjectives: baṛā "big", choṭā "small", acchā "good", burā "bad", kālā "black", ṭhanḍā "cold"..
- Examples of declinable (type-II) adjectives: dāyā̃ "right (direction)", bāyā̃ "left (direction)".
- Examples of indeclinable adjectives: xarāb "bad", sāf "clean", bhārī "heavy", murdā "dead", sundar "beautiful", pāgal "crazy/mad", lāl "red".

==== Comparatives and superlatives ====
Comparisons are made by using the instrumental postposition se (see below) the noun takes the oblique case and the combination of "noun + postposition" gets the instrumental case, and words like aur, zyādā ("more") and kam ("less") are added for relative comparisons. The word for "more" (zyādā) is optional, while "less" (kam) is required, so that in the absence of either, "more" will be inferred.

Hindustani

Gītā Gautam-se lambī hai
gita {than gautam} tall is
Gita is taller than Gautam.

Gītā Gautam-se zyādā lambī hai
gita {than gautam} more tall is
Gita is taller than Gautam.

Gītā Gautam-se adhik lambī hai
gita {than gautam} more tall is
Gita is taller than Gautam.

Gītā Gautam-se aur lambī hai
gita {than gautam} more tall is
Gita is even more tall than Gautam.

Gītā Gautam jitnī lambī hai
gita gautam {as much} tall is
Gita is as tall as Gautam.

Gītā Gautam-se kam lambī hai
gita {than gautam} less tall is
Gita is less tall than Gautam.

In the absence of an object of comparison the word for "more" is now no longer optional:

baccā zyādā baṛā hai kid more big is The kid is bigger.	baccā adhik baṛā hai kid more big is The kid is bigger.	zyādā baṛā baccā more big kid The bigger kid.	aur baṛā baccā more big kid The bigger kid.
baccā {utnā hi} lambā hai kid {just as much} tall/long is The kid is just as tall (as someone else).	{utnā hī} baṛā baccā {just as much} big kid The just as big kid.		
baccā kam baṛā hai kid less big is The kid is less big.	kam baṛā baccā less big kid The shorter kid.		

Superlatives are made through comparisons with sab ("all") with the instrumental postposition se as the suffix. Comparisons using "least" are rare; it is more common to use an antonym.

kamrā sabse sāf hai room {than all} clean is The room is the cleanest	sabse sāf kamrā {than all} clean room The cleanest room.
kamrā sabse kam sāf hai room {than all} less clean is The room is the least clean	sabse kam sāf kamrā {than all} less clean room The least clean room
kamrā sabse gandā hai room {than all} dirty is The room is the dirtiest	sabse gandā kamrā {than all} dirty room The dirtiest room.

In Sanskritised and Persianised registers of Hindustani, comparative and superlative adjectival forms using suffixes derived from those languages can be found.

	English	Sanskrit	Persian
Comparative	-er	-tar	
Superlative	-est	-tam	-tarīn

=== Numerals ===
The numeral systems of several of the Indo-Aryan languages, including Hindustani and Nepali, are typical decimal systems, but contracted to the extent that nearly every number 1–99 is irregular. The first four, and sixth, ordinal numbers are also irregular. The suffix -vā̃ marks ordinals five and seven onwards. The ordinals decline in the same way as the declinable adjectives. The suffix -gunā (translates as "times" as in multiplying) marks the multipliers which for the first three multipliers changes the numeral root. The collective forms of numerals take the same form as the oblique plural case for masculine nouns. They are formed by adding the suffix -õ. There are two types of adverbials. The first type is formed using the suffix -bārā but only for the numerals 2, 3, and 4 (but it's rarely used for 3 and even more rarely for 4). The second type of adverbial is constructed periphrastically using the quantifier bār meaning "times" (as in turns). The adverbial dobārā could be translated as "again" or "for a second time", similarly tibārā and caubārā mean "for a third time" and "for a fourth time" respectively. However, the periphrasatic adverbial constructions do bār, tīn bār etc. translate as "two times", "three times" etc. respectively.

Numeral	English	Cardinals	Ordinals	Multipliers	Collective	Adverbial		Fractional
0	zero	sūnā, śūnya^{H}, sifar^{U}	śūnyavā̃^{H}, sifarvā̃^{U}	śūnyagunā	─	─	śūnya bār	─
1	one	ek	pahlā, pratham^{H}, avval^{U}	ekgunā	─	─	ek bār	pūrā
2	two	do	dūsrā, dvitīya^{H}, dom^{U}	dugnā, dogunā	donõ	dobārā, dubārā	do bār	ādhā
3	three	tīn	tīsrā, tṛtīya^{H}, som^{U}	tigunā, tīngunā	tīnõ	tibārā	tīn bār	tihāī
4	four	cār	cauthā, caturth^{H}, cahāram^{U}	caugunā, cārgunā	cārõ	caubārā	cār bār	cauthāī
5	five	pā̃c	pā̃cvā̃, pañcam^{H}, pãjam^{U}	pā̃cgunā, pacgunā	pācõ	─	pā̃c bār	─
6	six	chaḥ	chaṭhā, chaṭhvā̃, ṣaṣṭ^{H}, śaśm^{U}	chaḥgunā	chaḥõ	─	chaḥ bār	─
7	seven	sāt	sātvā̃, saptam^{H}, haftam^{U}	sātgunā	sātõ	─	sāt bār	─
8	eight	āṭh	āṭhvā̃, aṣṭam^{H}, haśtam^{U}	āṭhgunā	āṭhõ	─	āṭh bār	─
9	nine	nau	nauvā̃, navā̃, navam^{H}, naham^{U}	naugunā	nauõ	─	nau bār	─
10	ten	das	dasvā̃, daśam^{H}, daham^{U}	dasgunā	dasõ	─	das bār	daśam^{H}
100	hundred	sau, śat^{H}, sad^{U}	sauvā̃, śatam^{H}, sadum^{U}	saugunā	sauõ	─	sau bār	śatam^{H}
1,000	thousand	sahas, sahasra^{H}, hazār^{B}	sahasvā̃, sahasratam^{H}, sahasravā̃^{H}, hazārum^{U}, hazārvā̃^{B}	sahasgunā, hazārgunā	sahasõ, hazārõ	─	sahas bār, hazār bār	─
100,000	hundred thousand	lākh, lakṣa^{H},	lākhvā̃, lakṣatam^{H}, lakṣavā̃^{H}	lākhgunā	lākhõ	─	lākh bār	─
10,000,000	ten million	karoṛ, koṭi^{H}	karoṛvā̃, koṭitam^{H}	karoṛguna	karoṛõ	─	karoṛ bār	─

- ^{H} = Hindi; ^{U} = Urdu; ^{B} = Both but comes from Persian

=== Postpositions ===
The aforementioned inflectional case system only goes so far on its own, and rather serves as that upon which is built a system of agglutinative suffixes or particles known as postpositions, which parallel English's prepositions. It is their use with a noun or verb that necessitates the noun or verb taking the oblique case (though the bare oblique is also sometimes used adverbially), and it is with them that the locus of grammatical function or "case-marking" then lies. There are eight such "one-word" primary case-marking postpositions.

==== Primary postpositions ====
Case-markers
Case	Marker	Example	English	Explanation
Nominative	─	laṛkā	"the boy"	marks the subject
Ergative	ne	laṛke ne	"the boy"	marks the subject for transitive verbs in their perfective aspect
Accusative	ko	laṛke ko	"the boy"	marks the direct object
Dative	ko	laṛke ko	"to the boy"	marks the direct object; can also mark dative subjects (see also Dative construction § Hindustani)
Instrumental	se	laṛke se	"with the boy"	marks the instrument of the action; "with", "using", "by"
Ablative	se	laṛke se	"from the boy"	ablative, and perlative marker; "from", "through", "along"
Genitive	kā	laṛke kā	"boy's"	shows possession;
Inessive	mẽ	laṛke mẽ	"in the boy"	shows something is in/inside something;
Adessive	pe/par	laṛke pe	"on the boy"	shows something is on/at something;
Terminative	tak	laṛke tak	"till the boy"	shows end or limit; "until", "till", "up to".
Semblative	sā	laṛke sā	"boy-ish"	shows resemblance and similarity; "like", "similar to", "resembles","-esque", "-ish".

Genitive & semblative marker declension
Case	m.		f.	
Case	Singular	Plural	Singular	Plural
Nominative	-ā	-e	-ī	
Oblique	-e		-ī	

- Out of these 8 postpositions, the genitive and semblative postpositions kā & sā decline to agree with the gender, number, and case of the object it shows possession of and the object whose semblance is described.
- For some verbs like bolnā (to speak/say), the speaker can use both the instrumental marker se and the accusative/dative marker ko. For example, rāhul se bolo and rāhul ko bolo both translate to the same "Say it to Rahul." However, the nuance expressed by both are different, instrumental marker se has a softer tone to it. rāhul se bolo is more like a suggestion in form of an imperative while rāhul ko bolo is an order.
- Beyond the list above, there is a large range of compound postpositions, constructed majoritarily from the genitive marker kā (in its oblique cases ke and kī) plus an adverb. When using with pronouns, these all the compound postpositions can only be used with the genitive oblique case pronouns and the genitive kī/ke must be omitted before attaching them with the genitive oblique case.

==== Secondary postpositions ====
Compound postpositions	Explanation	Compound postpositions	Explanation
kī or/taraf	orientative marker; "towards",	ke bārē	"concerning (something)"
ke andar	inessive marker; "inside",	ke bād	antessive marker; "after"
ke bāhar	elative marker "outside"	ke pās	adessive marker; "near"
ke baġal	adessive marker "adjacent"	ke jaisā	semblative marker, "like" "similar to"
ke āge	apudessive marker; "in front of, ahead of",	ke liye	benefactive marker; "for"
ke ūpar	superessive marker; "on top of, above"	ke sāmne	postessive case "facing, opposite, in front", etc.
ke nīce	subessive marker; "beneath, below"	ke pīche	pertingent marker; "behind"
ke binā/baġair	abessive marker; "without"	ke dvārā/zariye	perlative marker; "via, through, by"

Some compound postpositions do not have the genitive marker as their primary postposition, such as:

Compound postpositions	Explanation
tak mẽ	limitative marker "within"

==== Tertiary postpositions ====
Some other compound postpositions with two secondary postpositions (called tertiary postposition) can be constructed by adding primary postpositions to some of the compound postpositions shown above.

Compound postpositions	Marker	Explanation
ke bāre mẽ	"about"	"regarding/concerning/about something"
ke bād mẽ	antessive marker; "after (emphatic)"	"(in a sequence) something is after something"
ke sāth mẽ	sociative marker; "with (emphatic)"	"something is along/together with something else"
ke nīce mẽ	subessive marker; "beneath, below (emphatic)"	"location of something is below something else"
kī vajah se/ke kāraṇvaś	causal marker, "because of"	"something happens/happened because of (fault of) something else"
ke pīche se	postelative marker; "from behind"	"motion/movement from behind something"
ke andar se	inessive marker; "inside",	"motion/movement from inside something"
ke āge se	"from in front"	"motion/movement from in front of something"
ke pās se	adelative marker; "from near (something)"	"motion/movement near something"
ke nīce se	subessive marker; "beneath, below"	"motion/movement from below something"
ke ūpar se	delative marker; "from above"	"motion/movement from above something"
ke ūpar ko	sublative marker;	"motion/movement onto a surface"
kī taraf ko	"towards [a direction] (emphatic)"	"motion/movement towards a direction"

=== Pronouns ===
==== Personal and non-personal pronouns ====
Hindustani has personal pronouns for the first and second persons, while for the third person demonstratives are used, which can be categorised deictically as proximate and non-proximate. tū, tum, and āp are the three second-person pronouns, constituting a threefold scale of sociolinguistic formality: respectively, intimate, familiar, and formal. The second-person intimate conjugations are grammatically singular while the second-person familiar and formal conjugations are grammatically plural. For the non-personal pronouns (demonstrative, relative, and interrogative) the plural forms are also the formal forms. Pronouns in Hindustani do not distinguish gender however they distinguish the nominative, oblique, and the common accusative/dative grammatical cases. The latter-most, often called a set of contracted forms, is used synonymously with the dative/accusative pronoun constructed from the oblique case by suffixing the dative/accusative postposition ko. So, for e.g., mujhe and mujhko are synonymous dative/accusative pronouns.

The first- and second-person pronouns (except the formal second-person pronoun āp) have their own distinctive genitive forms merā, hamārā, terā, and tumhārā unlike the non-personal pronouns whose genitive forms are constructed employing the oblique case pronoun to which the genitive postposition kā is suffixed (OBL + kā). The personal pronouns (except the formal second-person āp) colloquially can also take the genitive oblique case before primary postpositions. So, instead of mujhe or mujhko, the periphrastic construction mere ko is fairly commonly heard as a synonym to mujhe/mujhko in colloquial speech.

To construct the ergative case pronouns, the ergative postposition ne is suffixed to the nominative case forms rather than the oblique case forms for the personal pronouns, while the demonstrative, relative, and interrogative pronouns have unique ergative oblique case forms to which ne gets suffixed. So, rather than *mujh-ne and *tujh-ne, it's maĩ-ne and tū-ne, and for the non-personal pronouns (e.g., for demonstrative plural) it's inhõ-ne and unhõ-ne. The first-person plural and the second-person familiar pronouns also have an emphatic ergative case form which respectively are hamī̃ne and tumhī̃ne which are derived using the exclusive emphatic particle hī as ham + hī + ne and tum + hī + ne. For the rest of the personal pronouns, the inclusive emphatic particle hī must come after the pronoun in ergative case and never between the pronoun and the postposition ne. So, rather than maĩ-hī-ne, it is periphrastically constructed as maĩne hī. As for the non-personal pronouns, both ways of constructing the emphatic forms are grammatically valid. So, for example the demonstrative proximal singular emphatic pronoun isīne and isne hī are synonymous. The emphatic forms for the relative pronouns are constructed periphrastically as well, but they instead use the inclusive emphatic particle bhī. So, the emphatic form of the relative singular ergative pronoun jisne is jisne bhī meaning "whoever" and not *jis-bhī-ne, which not a valid construction.

Compound postpositions must be used with the genitive oblique cases when using them with the personal pronouns (except the second-person formal āp). So, when using the compound postposition ke andar – "inside", *mujh-ke andar and *mujh andar are grammatically invalid constructions and instead it should be mere andar – "inside me". The compound postpositions that have the primary postposition kī in place of kā must have the genitive oblique case declined to the feminine gender. So, when using the postposition kī taraf – "towards", it should be merī taraf and not *mere taraf.

Case		Personal				
Case		1st person		2nd person		
Case		sg.	pl.	sg.	sg. & pl.	
Case		sg.	pl.	Intimate	Familiar	Formal
Nominative		maĩ	ham	tū	tum	āp
Ergative	Regular	maĩne	hamne	tūne	tumne	āpne
Ergative	Emphatic	─	hamī̃ne	─	tumhī̃ne	─
Dative		mujhe	hamẽ	tujhe	tumhẽ	āpko
Accusative		mujhe	hamẽ	tujhe	tumhẽ	āpko
Oblique	Regular	mujh	ham	tujh	tum	āp
Oblique	Emphatic	mujhī	hamī̃	tujhī	tumhī̃	─

Case		Demonstrative				Relative		Interrogative	
Case		3rd person							
Case		Proximal		Non-proximal		sg.	pl.	sg.	pl.
Case		sg.	pl.	sg.	pl.	sg.	pl.	sg.	pl.
Nominative	Literary	yah	ye	vah	ve	jo		kaun, kyā	
Nominative	Colloquial	ye		vo		jo		kaun, kyā	
Ergative	Regular	isne	inhõne	usne	unhõne	jisne	jinhõne	kisne	kinhõne
Ergative	Emphatic	isīne	inhī̃ne	usīne	unhī̃ne	─	─	kisīne	kinhī̃ne
Dative		ise	inhẽ	use	unhẽ	jise	jinhẽ	kise	kinhẽ
Accusative		ise	inhẽ	use	unhẽ	jise	jinhẽ	kise	kinhẽ
Oblique	Regular	is	in	us	un	jis	jin	kis	kin
Oblique	Emphatic	isī	inhī̃	usī	unhī̃	─	─	kisī	kinhī̃

Case			Possessive and genitive			
Case			1st person		2nd person	
Case			sg.	pl.	sg.	sg. & pl.
Case			sg.	pl.	Intimate	Familiar
Nominative	m.	sg.	merā	hamārā	terā	tumhārā
Nominative	m.	pl.	mere	hamāre	tere	tumhāre
Oblique	m.	sg. & pl.	mere	hamāre	tere	tumhāre
Nominative	f.	sg. & pl.	merī	hamārī	terī	tumhārī
Oblique	f.	sg. & pl.	merī	hamārī	terī	tumhārī

Note

1. Postpositions are treated as bound morphemes after pronouns in Hindi, but as separate words in Urdu.
2. The varying forms for the demonstrative nominative case pronouns constitute one of the small number of grammatical differences between Hindi and Urdu. In Hindi, yah "this" / ye "these" / vah "that" / ve "those" are considered the literary pronoun set while in Urdu (as well as usually in colloquial Hindi), ye "this, these" / vo "that, those" is the only pronoun set.
3. The above section on postpositions noted that ko (the dative/accusative case) marks direct objects if definite. As "the most specific thing of all is an individual", persons (or their pronouns) nearly always take the dative case or postposition.
4. It is very common practice to use plural pronouns (and their accompanying conjugation) in formal situations, thus tum can be used in the second person when referring to one person. Similarly, some speakers prefer plural ham over singular maĩ. This is usually not quite the same as the "royal we"; it is rather colloquial.

==== Reflexive pronouns ====
apnā is a (genitive) reflexive pronoun: "my/your/etc. (own)". Using non-reflexive and reflexive together gives emphasis; e.g. merā apnā "my (very) own". svayam, xud and āp are some (nominative; non-genitive) others: "my/your/etc.-self". Bases for oblique usage are usually apne (self) or apne āp (automatically). The latter alone can also mean "of one's own accord"; āpas mẽ means "among/between oneselves".

Reflexive Pronouns	Case		Singular	Plural	Singular	Plural	Translation
Reflexive Pronouns	Case		Masculine		Feminine		Translation
Undeclinable	Nominative & oblique		svayam				self
Undeclinable	Nominative & oblique		xud				self
Undeclinable	Nominative & oblique		apne āp				by oneself, automatically
Undeclinable	Nominative & oblique		āpas mẽ				among oneselves
Declinable	Nominative		apnā	apne	apnī	apnī	of one's own
Declinable	Oblique	with noun	apne	apne	apnī	apnī	of one's own
Declinable	Oblique	sans noun	apne	apnõ	apnī	apniyõ	of one's own

==== Indefinite quantifier pronouns ====
koī and kuch are indefinite pronouns/quantifiers. As pronouns, koī is used for animate singular ("someone") and kuch for animate plural and inanimates ("something"). As quantifiers/adjectives koī is used for singular count nouns and kuch for mass nouns and plural count nouns. koī takes the form kisī in the oblique. The form kaī is a paucal equivalent to koī, being used in the context of "several" or "a few" things. kuch can also act as an adverb, qualifying an adjective, meaning "rather". koī preceding a number takes the meaning of "about, approximately". In this usage it does not oblique to kisī.

Indefinite quantifier pronouns		nominative		oblique		Translation
Indefinite quantifier pronouns		animate	inanimate	animate	inanimate	Translation
singular	with noun	koī	kuch	kisī	kisī	someone, something
singular	sans noun	koī	─	kisī	─	someone, something
paucal	with noun	kuch		kuch		some
paucal	sans noun	kuch		kuchõ	─	some
plural	with noun	kaī		kaī		several
plural	sans noun	kaī		kaiyõ	─	several

==== Adverbial pronouns ====
		Interrogative	Relative	Demonstrative	
		Interrogative	Relative	Proximal	Distant
Undeclinable	Time	kab	jab	ab	tab
Undeclinable	Direction	kidhar	jidhar	idhar	udhar
Undeclinable	Place	kahā̃	jahā̃	yahā̃	vahā̃
Undeclinable	Manner	kaise	jaise	aise	vaise
Declinable	Quantity	kitnā	jitnā	itnā	utnā
Declinable	Quality	kaisā	jaisā	aisā	vaisā

Note:

- The feminine plural forms are commonly used as singular respect forms and the feminine singular forms often are used interchangeably with the feminine plural forms.
- The declension pattern followed is the same as how genitive pronouns and postpositions decline.

==== Emphatic pronouns ====
Emphatic pronouns of Hindustani are formed by combining the exclusive emphatic particle hī or the inclusive emphatic particle bhī (with the interrogatory and relative pronouns respectively) and the pronoun in their regular oblique and nominative case. Usually, combining the emphatic particles and the pronouns with end with the consonant -h form a new set of emphatic nominative case and emphatic oblique case pronouns. The rest of the pronouns can also be combined with the exclusive emphatic particle but they do not form true pronouns, but simply add the emphatic particle as an adposition after them. The relative and interrogatory pronouns can only take the inclusive emphatic particle bhī as an adposition and never the exclusive emphatic particle hī.

		Personal					Demonstrative			
		1st person		2nd person			3rd person			
		Singular	Plural	Singular	Plural		Proximal		Non-proximal	
		Singular	Plural	Intimate	Familiar	Formal	Singular	Plural	Singular	Plural
Nominative		─	hamī̃	─	tumhī̃	─	yahī	─	vahī	─
Oblique	Emphatic	mujhī	hamī̃	tujhī	tumhī̃	─	isī	inhī̃	usī	unhī̃

=== Adverbs ===
Hindustani has few underived forms. Adverbs may be derived in ways such as the following —

1. Simply obliquing some nouns and adjectives:
  - nīcā "low" → nīce "down"
  - sīdhā "straight" → sīdhe "straight"
  - dhīrā "slow" → dhīre "slowly"
  - saverā "morning" → savere "in the morning"
  - ye taraf "this direction" → is taraf "in this direction/this way"
  - kalkattā "Calcutta" → kalkatte "to Calcutta".
2. Nouns using the instrumental marker se "by, with, -ly":
  - zor "force" → zor se "forcefully" (lit. "with force")
  - dhyān "attention" → dhyān se "attentively" (lit. "with attention")
3. Adjectives using post-positional phrases involving "way, manner":
  - acchā "good" → acche se "well" (lit. "by/in a good way")
  - xās "special" → xāskar/xās taur pe "especially" (lit. "on a special way")
4. Verbs in conjunctive form:
  - hãs "laugh" → hãske "laughingly" (lit. "having laughed")
  - miharbānī kar "do kindness" → miharbānī karke "kindly, please" (lit. "having done kindness")
5. Formative suffixes from Sanskrit or Perso-Arabic in higher registers of Hindi or Urdu
  - Sanskrit sambhava "possible" + -taḥ → sambhavataḥ "possibly".
  - Persian ba- + Arabic xās "special" + Arabic ṭawr "manner" → ba xās taur "especially" (lit. "on a special way")
  - Arabic ittifāq "chance" + -an → ittifāqan "by chance", "coincidentally".

== Verbs ==
=== Overview ===
The Hindustani verbal system is largely structured around a combination of aspect, tense and mood. Like the nominal system, the Hindustani verb involves successive layers of (inflectional) elements to the right of the lexical base.

Hindustani has 3 aspects: perfective, habitual, and progressive, each having overt morphological correlates. These are participle forms, inflecting for gender and number by way of a vowel termination, like adjectives. The perfective, though displaying a "number of irregularities and morphophonemic adjustments", is the simplest, being just the verb stem followed by the agreement vowel. The habitual forms from the imperfective participle; verb stem, plus -t-, then vowel. The continuous forms periphrastically through compounding (see below) with the perfective of rahnā "to stay".

The copula honā "to be" can be put into five grammatical moods: indicative, presumptive, subjunctive, contrafactual, and imperative. Used both in basic predicative/existential sentences and as verbal auxiliaries to aspectual forms, these constitute the basis of tense and mood.

Non-aspectual forms include the infinitive, the imperative, and the conjunctive. Mentioned morphological conditions such as the subjunctive, "presumptive", etc. are applicable to both copula roots for auxiliary usage with aspectual forms and to non-copula roots directly for often unspecified (non-aspectual) finite forms.

Finite verbal agreement is with the nominative subject, except in the transitive perfective, where it is with the direct object, with the erstwhile subject taking the ergative construction -ne (see postpositions above). The perfective aspect thus displays split ergativity.

Tabled below on the left are the paradigms for adjectival concord (^{A}), here only slightly different from that introduced previously: the feminine plural can nasalise under certain conditions. To the right are the paradigms for personal concord (^{P}), used by the subjunctive.

(A)	sg.	pl.
masc.	-ā	-e
fem.	-ī	-ī / -ī̃

(P)	1st person	2nd person			3rd person			
(P)	1st person	Intimate	Familiar	Formal	Proximal	Distal	Proximal formal	Distal formal
Singular	-ū̃	-e	-o	-ẽ	-e		-ẽ	
Plural	-ẽ	—N/a	-o	-ẽ	-ẽ			

=== Copula in Hindustani ===
All the verbs in Hindustani except the verb honā (to be) are defective and cannot be conjugated into these following moods and tenses in their non-aspectual forms (or simple aspect):

- present indicative
- imperfect indicative
- presumptive mood
- present subjunctive

The verb honā (to be) serves as the copula whose conjugations are used to form the three aspectual (or compound) forms of verbs (habitual, perfective, and progressive). In the tables below all the conjugations of the copula honā (to be) are shown on the left and all the conjugations of the verb karnā (to do) (like which all other verbs have conjugations) are shown on the right.

Personal forms of "honā (to be)"
mood	tense	singular						plural	
mood	tense	1P – maĩ		2P – tum^{1}		3P – yah/ye, vah/vo		1P – ham	
mood	tense	1P – maĩ		2P – tum^{1}		3P – yah/ye, vah/vo		2P – āp^{1}	
mood	tense	1P – maĩ		2P – tum^{1}		2P – tū		3P – ye, ve/vo	
mood	tense	m.	f.	m.	f.	m.	f.	m.	f.
indicative	present	hū̃		ho		hai		haĩ	
indicative	perfect	huā	huī	hue	huī	huā	huī	hue	huī̃
indicative	imperfect	thā	thī	the	thī	thā	thī	the	thī̃
indicative	future	hoū̃gā / hū̃gā	hoū̃gī / hū̃gī	hooge / hoge	hoogī / hogī	hoegā / hogā	hoegī / hogī	hoẽge / hõge	hoẽgī / hõgī
presumptive	all	hū̃gā	hū̃gī	hoge	hogī	hogā	hogī	hõge	hõgī
subjunctive	present	hū̃		ho		ho		hõ	
subjunctive	future	hoū̃		hoo		hoe		hoẽ	
contrafactual^{2}	past	hotā	hotī	hote	hotī	hotā	hotī	hote	hotī̃
imperative	present	—		hoo		ho		hoiye	
imperative	future	—		honā		hoiyo		hoiyegā	

conjugations of "karnā (to do)"
mood	tense	singular						plural	
mood	tense	1P – maĩ		2P – tum^{1}		3P – yah/ye, vah/vo		1P – ham	
mood	tense	1P – maĩ		2P – tum^{1}		3P – yah/ye, vah/vo		2P – āp^{1}	
mood	tense	1P – maĩ		2P – tum^{1}		2P – tū		3P – ye, ve/vo	
mood	tense	m.	f.	m.	f.	m.	f.	m.	f.
indicative	perfect	kiyā	kī	kiye	kī	kiyā	kī	kiye	kī̃
indicative	future	karū̃gā	karū̃gī	karoge	karogī	karegā	karegī	karẽge	karẽgī
subjunctive	future	karū̃		karo		kare		karẽ	
contrafactual	past	kartā	kartī	karte	kartī	kartā	kartī	karte	kartī̃
imperative	present	—		karo		kar		kariye / kījiye	
imperative	future	—		karnā		kariyo		kariyegā / kījiyegā	

- ^{1} the pronouns tum and āp can be used in both singular and plural sense by adding plural indicator words like sab (all) and log (people), akin to the American English pronouns "you" and "y'all".
- ^{2} the contrafactual mood serves as both the past subjunctive and the past conditional mood.

=== Compound tenses ===
Periphrastic Hindustani verb forms consist of two elements. The first of these two elements is the aspect marker. The second element (the copula) is the common tense-mood marker.

=== Mood & aspects ===
Hindustani has three aspects: habitual aspect, perfective aspect and the progressive aspect. To construct the progressive aspect and forms, Hindustani makes use of the progressive participle rahā which is derived from the verb rahnā ("to stay" or "to remain"). Unlike English and many other Indo-European languages, Hindustani does differentiate between continuous and the progressive aspects. So, for example the sentence maĩ śarṭ pahan rahā hū̃ will always translate as "I am (in the process) of wearing a shirt" and it can never be used to mean "I am (already) wearing a shirt". In English, however, "I am wearing a shirt" can be used to mean both the idea of progressive action and a continuous action. To convey the continuous state of an action the perfective adjectival participle is employed. So, "I am (already) wearing a shirt" translates into Hindustani as maĩ śarṭ pahnā huā hū̃. All the personal compound forms of the verb karnā (to do) in all three aspects and all the grammatical moods are shown in the table below:

Compound aspectual forms
mood	tense	singular						plural	
mood	tense	1P – maĩ		2P – tum^{1}		3P – yah/ye, vah/vo		1P – ham	
mood	tense	1P – maĩ		2P – tum^{1}		3P – yah/ye, vah/vo		2P – āp^{1}	
mood	tense	1P – maĩ		2P – tum^{1}		2P – tū		3P – ye, ve/vo	
mood	tense	m.	f.	m.	f.	m.	f.	m.	f.
Habitual aspect^{2}'
indicative	present	kartā hū̃	kartī hū̃	karte ho	kartī ho	kartā hai	kartī hai	karte haĩ	kartī haĩ
indicative	past	kartā thā	kartī thī	karte the	kartī thī	kartā thā	kartī thī	karte the	kartī thī̃
presumptive	present	kartā hū̃gā	kartī hū̃gī	karte hoge	kartī hogī	kartā hogā	kartī hogī	karte hõge	kartī hõgī
presumptive	past	kartā hū̃gā	kartī hū̃gī	karte hoge	kartī hogī	kartā hogā	kartī hogī	karte hõge	kartī hõgī
subjunctive	present	kartā hū̃	kartī hū̃	karte ho	kartī ho	kartā ho	kartī ho	kartā hõ	kartī hõ
contrafactual	past	kartā hotā	kartī hotī	karte hote	kartī hotī	kartā hotā	kartī hotī	karte hote	kartī hotī̃
Perfective aspect^{3}
indicative	present	—	—	—	—	kiyā hai	kī hai	kiye haĩ	kī haĩ
indicative	past	—	—	—	—	kiyā thā	kī thī	kiye the	kī thī̃
indicative	future	—	—	—	—	kiyā hoegā	kī hoegī	kiye hoẽge	kī hoẽgī
presumptive	present	—	—	—	—	kiyā hogā	kī hogī	kiye hõge	kī hõgī
presumptive	past	—	—	—	—	kiyā hogā	kī hogī	kiye hõge	kī hõgī
presumptive	future	—	—	—	—	kiyā hogā	kī hogī	kiye hõge	kī hõgī
subjunctive	present	—	—	—	—	kiyā ho	kī ho	kiye hõ	kī hõ
subjunctive	future	—	—	—	—	kiyā hoe	kī hoe	kiye hoẽ	kī hoẽ
contrafactual	past	—	—	—	—	kiyā hotā	kī hotī	kiye hote	kī hotī̃
Progressive aspect^{4}
indicative	present	kar rahā hū̃	kar rahī hū̃	kar rahe ho	kar rahī ho	kar rahā hai	kar rahī hai	kar rahe haĩ	kar rahī haĩ
indicative	past	kar rahā thā	kar rahī thī	kar rahe the	kar rahī thī	kar rahā thā	kar rahī thī	kar rahe the	kar rahī thī̃
indicative	future	kar rahā hoū̃gā	kar rahī hoū̃gī	kar rahe hooge	kar rahī hoogī	kar rahā hoegā	kar rahī hoegī	kar rahe hoẽge	kar rahī hoẽgī
presumptive	present	kar rahā hū̃gā	kar rahī hū̃gī	kar rahe hoge	kar rahī hogī	kar rahā hogā	kar rahī hogī	kar rahe hõge	kar rahī hõgī
presumptive	past	kar rahā hū̃gā	kar rahī hū̃gī	kar rahe hoge	kar rahī hogī	kar rahā hogā	kar rahī hogī	kar rahe hõge	kar rahī hõgī
presumptive	future	kar rahā hū̃gā	kar rahī hū̃gī	kar rahe hoge	kar rahī hogī	kar rahā hogā	kar rahī hogī	kar rahe hõge	kar rahī hõgī
subjunctive	present	kar rahā hū̃	kar rahī hū̃	kar rahe ho	kar rahī ho	kar rahā ho	kar rahī ho	kar rahe hõ	kar rahī hõ
subjunctive	future	kar rahā hoū̃	kar rahī hoū̃	kar rahe hoo	kar rahī hoo	kar rahā hoe	kar rahī hoe	kar rahe hoẽ	kar rahī hoẽ
contrafactual	past	kar rahā hotā	kar rahī hotī	kar rahe hote	kar rahī hotī	kar rahā hotā	kar rahī hotī	kar rahe hote	kar rahī hotī̃

* ^{1} the pronouns tum and āp can be used in both singular and plural sense, akin to the English pronoun "you".
- ^{2} the habitual aspect of Hindustani cannot be put into future tense.
- ^{3} the perfective aspect behaves ergatively, agreeing with the object of the sentence. However, if the object is marked with the postposition ko, the noun is placed in the third-person masculine singular. As personal object pronouns are always marked with ko, there are no personal perfective forms.
- ^{4} unlike English in which both the continuous and the progressive aspect have the same forms, the progressive aspect of Hindustani cannot convey the continuous aspect.

=== Different copulas ===
The habitual, progressive, and imperfect aspectual participles can be used with copulas other than honā (to be) such as rahnā (to stay), ānā (to come), jānā (to go). These copulas can be converted into their participle forms and can be conjugated to form personal compound aspectual forms. Each of the four copulas provides a unique nuance to the aspect.

Aspect												Translation
Simple	Perfective					Habitual				Progressive		Translation
honā	huā honā	huā karnā	huā rahnā	huā jānā	huā ānā	hotā honā	hotā rahnā	hotā ānā	hotā jānā	ho rahā honā	ho rahā rahnā	to happen
karnā	kiyā honā	kiyā karnā	kiyā rahnā	kiyā janā	kiyā anā	kartā honā	kartā rahnā	kartā ānā	kartā jānā	kar rahā honā	kar rahā rahnā	to do
marnā	marā honā	marā karnā	marā rahnā	marā jānā	marā ānā	martā honā	martā rahnā	martā ānā	martā jānā	mar rahā honā	mar rahā rahnā	to die

=== Participles ===
The participle forms of any verb is constructed by adding suffixes to the verb root. The participle forms of the verb karnā (to do) are shown in the tables below:

Undeclinable
	Verb forms	English equivalent
Infinitive	karnā	to do
Oblique infinitive	karne	do, doing
Conjunctive	karke, karkar	after/by doing
Progressive	karte-karte	while doing

Declinable
Habitual	kartā (sg., masc.) karte (pl., masc.) kartī (sg., fem.) kartī̃ (pl., fem.)	does/do, used to do
Perfective	kiyā (sg., masc.) kiye (pl., masc.) kī (sg., fem.) kī̃ (pl., fem.)	did
Infinitive	karnā (sg., masc.) karne (pl., masc.) karnī (sg., fem.) karnī̃ (pl., fem.)	to do
Prospective & agentive	karnevālā (sg., masc.) karnevāle (pl., masc.) karnevālī (sg., pl. fem.) karnevālī̃ (pl., fem.)	going to do
Perfective adjectival	kiyā-huā (sg., masc.) kiye-hue (pl., masc.) kī-huī (sg. fem.) kī-huī̃ (pl. fem.)	(already) done
Habitual adjectival	kartā-huā (sg., masc.) karte-hue (pl., masc.) kartī-huī (sg., fem.) kartī-huī̃ (pl., fem.)	while doing

- Declining the infinitive may be based on dialect and usually not done in more formal settings, for example mujhē ye kitāb paṛhnī hai versus mujhē ye kitāb paṛhnā hai for "I need to read this book."

=== Verb forms ===
A summary of all verb forms is given in the tables below. The sample verb is intransitive dauṛnā "to run", and the sample inflection is 3rd person masc. sg. (^{P} = e, ^{A} = ā) where applicable.

Non-aspectual
Aspectual
Non-finite

Root	*	dauṛ
Infinitive	*-nā,	dauṛnā
Oblique Infinitive	*-ne	dauṛne
Conjunctive	*-kar, *-ke	dauṛkar, dauṛke
Progressive	*-te-*-te	dauṛte-dauṛte
Agentive	*-ne vāl-^{A}, *-nevāl-^{A}	dauṛne vālā, dauṛnevālā
Prospective	*-ne vāl-^{A}, *-nevāl-^{A}	dauṛne vālā, dauṛnevālā

Adjectival
Perfective	*-^{A} (hu-^{A})	dauṛā (huā)
Imperfective	*-t-^{A} (hu-^{A})	dauṛtā (huā)

Adverbial / Oblique of adjectival
Imperfective	*-t-e (hu-e)	dauṛte hue

Finite

Contingent future	*-^{P}	dauṛe
Definite future	*-^{P}-g-^{A}	dauṛegā

Imperatives
Present	Intimate	*	dauṛ
Present	Familiar	*-o	dauṛo
Present	Formal	*-iye	dauṛiye
Future	Intimate	*-iyo	dauṛiyo
Future	Familiar	*-nā	dauṛnā
Future	Formal	*-iyegā	dauṛiyegā

Aspectuals plotted against copulas
		Perfective	Habitual	Progressive
		*-^{A}	*-t-^{A}	* rah-^{A}
Present perfect	h-?	dauṛā hai	dauṛtā hai	dauṛ rahā hai
Past perfect	th-^{A}	dauṛā thā	dauṛtā thā	dauṛ rahā thā
Subjunctive	ho-^{P}	dauṛā ho	dauṛtā ho	dauṛ rahā ho
Presumptive	ho-^{P} g-^{A}	dauṛā hogā	dauṛtā hogā	dauṛ rahā hogā
Contrafactual	ho-t-^{A}	dauṛā hotā	dauṛtā hotā	dauṛ rahā hotā
Unspecified		dauṛā	dauṛtā	

Notes

- Much of the above chart information derives from Masica (1991:292–294, 323–325).
- The future tense is formed by adding the suffix gā (~ ge ~ gī) to the subjunctive, which is a contraction of gaā (= gayā, perfective participle of jānā "to go"). The future suffix, conjunctive participle, and suffix vālā are treated as bound morphemes in written Hindi, but as separate words in written Urdu.
- The present copula (h-?) seems not to follow along the lines of the regular ^{P} system of terminations; while the subjunctive copula (ho-^{P}) is thoroughly irregular. So here are all of their forms.
- For the 1P subj. sg. copula Schmidt (2003:324) and Snell & Weightman (1989:113, 125) list hū̃ while Shapiro (2003:267) lists hoū̃.
- Shapiro (2003:268) lists the formal imperative ending as -iye, while Schmidt (2003:330) lists it as -ie but -iye after ā, o, ū.
- The euphonic glide y is inserted in perfective participles between prohibited vowel clusters. It is historically the remnant of the old perfective marker. The clusters are a + ā, ā + ā, o + ā, and ī + ā, resulting in āyā, ayā, oyā, iyā. e.g. khāyā/khāye/khāyī/khāyī̃ (khā- "eat").
- In addition, the combinations ī + ī and i + ī give ī. e.g. piyā/piye/pī/pī̃ (pī- "drink").
- As stated, agreement in the transitive perfective is with the direct object, with the erstwhile subject taking the ergative postposition ne. If however the direct object takes the postposition ko (marking definiteness), or if no direct object is expressed, then agreement neutralises to default m. sg. -ā.
- In this regard, there are a small number of verbs that while perhaps logically transitive still do not take ne and continue to agree with the subject, in the perfective. e.g. lānā "to bring", bhūlnā "to forget", milnā "to meet", etc.
- Besides supplying the copulas, honā "to be" can be used aspectually: huā "happened, became"; hotā "happens, becomes, is"; ho rahā "happening, being".
- -ke can be used as a colloquial alternative to -kar for the conjunctive participle of any verb.
- Hindustani displays a very small number of irregular forms, spelled out in the cells below. Historically, there were many more irregular forms (e.g. muā for marnā 'to die') but most have been regularised. Notably, some dialects regularise the perfective of karnā to karā and the formal imperative of kijiye to kariye.

Verb	Root	Perfective stem	Perfective forms				Imperative			Subjunctive stem		Subjunctive forms						
Verb	Root	Perfective stem	Perfective forms				Intimate	Familiar	Formal	Subjunctive stem		Subjunctive forms						
Verb	Root	Perfective stem	Masculine		Feminine		Intimate	Familiar	Formal	Subjunctive stem		Singular			Plural			
Verb	Root	Perfective stem	Masculine		Feminine		Intimate	Familiar	Formal	Subjunctive stem		1st	2nd	3rd	2nd		3rd	1st
Verb	Root	Perfective stem	Singular	Plural	Singular	Plural	Intimate	Familiar	Formal	Subjunctive stem		mãĩ	tū	ye/vo	tum	āp	ye/vo	ham
honā "to happen"	ho-	hu-	huā	hue	huī	huī̃	ho	hoo	hoiye	present subjunctive	h-	hū̃	ho		ho	hõ		
honā "to happen"	ho-	hu-	huā	hue	huī	huī̃	ho	hoo	hoiye	future subjunctive	ho-	hoū̃	hoe		ho'o	hoẽ		
jānā "to go"	jā-	ga-	gayā	gaye	gayī	gayī̃	jā	jāo	jāiye	jā		jāū̃	jāe		jāo	jāẽ		
karnā "to do"	kar-	ki-	kiyā	kiye	kī	kī̃	kar	karo	kījie	kar		karū̃	kare		karo	karẽ		
denā "to give"	de-	di-	diyā	diye	dī	dī̃	de	do	dījie	d-		dū̃	de		do	dẽ		
lenā "to take"	le-	li-	liyā	liye	lī	lī̃	le	lo	lījie	l-		lū̃	le		lo	lẽ		
pīnā "to drink"	pī-	pi-	piyā	piye	pī	pī̃	pī	piyo	pījie	pi-		piyū̃	piye		piyo	piyẽ		

- The irregular forms are underlined in the above table.
- There are two subjunctive stems for the verb honā, one being regular and the other being irregular. The regular set is the future subjunctive forms and the regular ones are the as the present subjunctive forms. honā is the only verb in Hindi to have distinct forms for the future and the present subjunctive, for all other forms there is one common subjunctive form which is used as both the present and the future subjunctive.
- However, it is jā- that is used as the perfective stem in the rare instance of an intransitive verb like jānā being expressed passively, such as in a passivized imperative/subjunctive construction: ghar jāyā jāye? "Shall [we] go home?" (literally "Shall home be gone to [by us]?").

=== Set of related verbs ===
Transitives are morphologically contrastive in Hindustani, leading to the existence of related verb sets divisible along such lines. While the derivation of such forms shows patterns, they do reach a level of variegation so as to make it somewhat difficult to outline all-encompassing rules. Furthermore, some sets may have as many as four to five distinct members; also, the meaning of certain members of given sets may be idiosyncratic.

These below are the verb forms that a verb in Hindi can have —

1. Intransitive
  1. Involitional — these are actions that cannot be done intentionally.
    1. Dative — these involitional verbs require the subject to be in the dative case.
    2. Non-dative — these verbs require the verb to be in the nominative case.
  2. Volitional — these are actions that can be intentionally done.
    1. Ergative — these verbs can take in the ergative case (the subject can be in the ergative case).
    2. Non-ergative — these verbs cannot take in the ergative case (the subject can only be in the nominative case).
2. Transitive
  1. Direct — the subject themselves experiences the action but the subject and the object are not the same
  2. Indirect — the subject imparts the action onto the object, the object is the experiencer of the action, it is usually translated into English as "to make (someone/something) verb"
  3. Reflexive — the verb does action on the subject itself, the doer and experiencer of the action is the same subject
  4. Causative — the subject causes the action to happen. Translation: "to cause to be [verb]ed", the agent takes the instrumental postposition se. Thus Y se Z banvānā = "to cause Z to be made by Y" = "to cause Y to make Z" = "to have Z made by Y" = "to have Y make Z", etc.

Starting from direct transitive verb forms, the other verb stems i.e., intransitive, causative, reflexive, indirect stems are produced according to these following (not exhaustive) assorted rules —

1. Root vowel changeː
  - a → ā
  - u / ū → o
  - i / ī → e
2. Sometimes the root vowel change accompanies the root's final consonant changeː
  - k → c
  - ṭ → ṛ
  - l → Ø
3. Suffixation of -ā to form the indirect or reflexive formː
  - Root vowel changeː ū/o → u; e/ai/ā/ī → i
  - Insertion of semivowel l between such vowel-terminating stems
4. Suffixation of -vā (in place of -ā where it would occur) to form the causative verb stem

Set of related verbs
English verbs	Intransitive				Transitive			
English verbs	involitional		volitional		direct	indirect	reflexive	causative
English verbs	non-dative	dative	non-ergative	ergative	direct	indirect	reflexive	causative
be, become	honā	—	—	—	—	—	—	—
happen, have	—	honā	—	—	—	—	—	hovānā
do	—	—	—	—	karnā	karānā	—	karvānā
fall	girnā	—	—	—	—	girānā	—	girvānā
prepare	bannā	—	—	—	—	banānā	—	banvānā
send	bhijnā	—	—	—	bhejnā	—	bhejānā	bhijvānā
dance	nacnā	—	—	nācnā	—	nacānā	—	nacvānā
be found	milnā	—	—	—	—	—	—	—
unite, mix	—	—	—	—	—	milānā	—	milvānā
receive	—	milnā	—	—	—	—	—	dilvānā
open	khulnā	—	—	—	kholnā	—	khulānā	khulvānā
open	khulnā	—	—	—	kholnā	—	kholānā	kholvānā
learn	—	—	—	—	sīkhnā	sikhānā	—	sikhvānā
eat	—	—	—	—	khānā	khilānā	—	khilvānā
come	—	—	anā	—	—	—	—	—
to know how to	—	anā	—	—	—	—	—	—
drink	—	—	—	—	pīnā	pilānā	—	pilvānā
sell	biknā	—	—	—	becnā	—	becānā	bikvānā
see	—	dikhnā	—	—	dekhnā	dikhānā	—	dikhvānā
appear, look like	dikhnā	—	—	—	—	—	—	—
look like	lagnā	—	—	—	—	—	—	—
stick/put together	—	—	lagnā	—	—	lagānā	—	lagvānā
feel, feel like	—	lagnā	—	—	—	lagānā	—	lagvānā
tell, be called	—	—	—	kahnā	—	—	kahlānā	kahalvānā
say, call	—	—	—	bolnā	—	bulānā	—	bulvānā
sit	biṭhnā	—	baiṭhnā	—	—	baiṭhānā	—	baiṭhvānā
break	ṭūṭnā	—	—	—	toṛnā	—	tuṛānā	tuṛvānā
understand	—	—	—	samajhnā	—	samjhānā	—	samajhvānā
tear	phaṭnā	—	—	—	phāṛnā	—	phaṛānā	phaṛvānā
blast, shatter	phūṭnā, phaṭnā	—	—	—	phoṛnā	—	phoṛānā	phoṛvānā
beat	piṭnā	—	—	—	pīṭnā	—	piṭānā	piṭvānā
bathe	—	—	—	nahānā	—	nahlānā	nahalnā	nahalvānā
know	—	—	—	jānnā	—	—	—	janvānā
laugh	—	—	hãsnā	—	—	hãsānā	—	hãsvānā

=== Light verbs ===
Compound verbs, a highly visible feature of Hindi–Urdu grammar, consist of a verbal stem plus a light verb. The light verb (also called "subsidiary", "explicator verb", and "vector") loses its own independent meaning and instead "lends a certain shade of meaning" to the main or stem verb, which "comprises the lexical core of the compound". While almost any verb can act as a main verb, there is a limited set of productive light verbs. Shown below are prominent such light verbs, with their independent meaning first outlined, followed by their semantic contribution as auxiliaries. Finally, having to do with the manner of an occurrence, compounds verbs are mostly used with completed actions and imperatives, and much less with negatives, conjunctives, and contexts continuous or speculative. This is because non-occurrences cannot be described to have occurred in a particular manner. The auxiliaries when combined with the main verb provides an aspectual sense to the main verb it modifies. Light verbs such as jānā "to go", ānā "to come", cuknā when combined with the main verb give the formed compound verb a perfective aspect, while retaining the original meaning of the main verb.

Perfective aspect compound verbs
Light verb	Explanation	Main verb	Examples
jānā "to go"	Shows perfective aspect (completed action) of the main verb which means gives a sense of completeness of the action, finality, or change of state.	1. ānā "to come" 2. khānā "to eat" 3. marnā "to die" 4. pīnā "to drink" 5. baiṭhnā "to sit" 6. honā "to happen"	1. ā jānā "to arrive" "to have come" 2. khā jānā "to eat up (all/everything/completely)" 3. mar jānā "to be dead" 4. pī jānā "to drink up (all/everything/completely)" "to gulp" 5. baiṭh jānā "to sit down" "to have sit down" 6. ho jānā "to have happened (completely)" "to have finished happening"
lenā "to take"	Suggests that the (usually planned/expected) action is completed and the benefit of the action flows towards the doer. This auxiliary verb can also be used to soften down the tone of imperatives (commands) and usually is used to give suggestions. Nuance of planned/expected action is not present.	1. paṛhnā 2. karnā 3. calnā 4. mārnā	1. paṛh lenā "to read (for oneself/for own's desire)" 2. kar lenā "to do (something fully for oneself)" "to have finished doing something" 3. cal lenā "to have walked" 4. mār lenā "to (try to) kill (oneself)"
denā "to give"	Suggests that the (usually planned/expected) action was completed and the benefit of the action flows away from the doer. This auxiliary verb can also be used to soften down the tone of imperatives (commands) and usually is used to ask for favours. Nuance of planned/expected action is not present. This can also mean "to let" in the imperative – to let someone do: karne denā (oblique)	1. paṛhnā 2. mārnā 3. karnā	1. paṛh denā "to read (for someone)" "to read out" 2. mār denā "to kill", "to kill off", "to murder" 3. kar denā "to do (something completely for someone else and not oneself)"
ānā "to come"	Shows perfective aspect of the main verb which means gives a sense of completeness of the action, finality, or change of state. The meaning conveyed is the doer went somewhere to do something and came back after completing the action. This can also mean "to know how to" in the indefinite/habitual present tense – to know how to do: karnā ānā	1. karnā	1. kar ānā "to finish (and come back)", "to do (and return)"
cuknā "to have (already) completed something"	Shows sense of completeness of an action in the past, that the action was already done/finished/completed by the doer sometime in the past.	1. marnā 2. jītnā	1. mar cuknā "to have already died" 2. jīt cuknā "to have already won"

The first three light verbs in the above table are the most common of auxiliaries, and the "least marked", or "lexically nearly colourless". The nuance conveyed by an auxiliary can often be very subtle, and need not always be expressed with different words in English translation. lenā and denā, transitive verbs, occur with transitives, while intransitive jānā occurs mostly with intransitives; a compound of a transitive and jānā will be grammatically intransitive as jānā is.

Light verb	Explanation	Examples
ḍālnā "to throw, pour"	Indicates an action done vigorously, decisively, violently or recklessly; it is an intensifier, showing intensity, urgency, completeness, or violence.	1. mārnā "to hit/ kill" → mār ḍālnā "to kill (violently)" 2. pīnā "to drink" → pī ḍālnā "to drink (hastily)"
baiṭhnā "to sit"	Implies an action done foolishly or stubbornly; shows speaker disapproval or an impulsive or involuntary action.	1. kahnā "to say" → kah baiṭhnā "to say something (involuntarily or by mistake)" 2. karnā "to do" → kar baiṭhnā "to do (something as a blunder)" 3. laṛnā "to fight" → laṛ baiṭhnā "to quarrel (foolishly, or without giving it second thought)".
paṛnā "to suddenly fall" "to lie flat"	Connotes involuntary, sudden, or unavoidable occurrence.; This can also mean "to have to, must" in the perfect tenses – to have to do: karnā paṛnā	1. uṭhnā "to get up" → uṭh paṛnā "to suddenly get up" 2. girnā "to fall down" → gir paṛnā "to collapse"
uṭhnā "to rise"	Functions like an intensifier; suggests inception of action or feeling, with its independent/literal meaning sometimes showing through in a sense of upward movement.	1. jalnā "to burn" → jal uṭhnā "to burst into flames" 2. nācnā "to dance" → nāc uṭhnā "to break into dance".
saknā "to be able to"	A modal verb that indicates the capability of performing an action.	1. karnā "to do" → kar saknā "to be able to do" 2. dekhnā "to see" → dekh saknā "to be able to see"
rakhnā "to keep, maintain"	Implies a firmness of action, or one with possibly long-lasting results or implications; occurs with lenā and denā, meaning "to give/take (as a loan)", and with other appropriate verbs, showing an action performed beforehand. It usually works almost the same as cuknā, the main difference being the nuance conveyed by rakhnā is that the action has either "continued effect till the present time" or "is more recent than the same action conveyed using cuknā. cuknā signifies distant past.	1. dekhnā "to see" → dekh rakhnā "to have already seen."
rahnā "to remain/stay"	The continuous aspect marker rahā apparently originated as a compound verb with rahnā ("remain"): thus maĩ bol rahā hū̃ = "I have remained speaking" → "I have continued speaking" → "I am speaking". However, it has lost the ability to take any form other than the imperfective, and is thus considered to have become grammaticalized.	

Finally, having to do with the manner of an occurrence, compounds verbs are mostly used with completed actions and imperatives, and much less with negatives, conjunctives, and contexts continuous or speculative. This is because non-occurrences cannot be described to have occurred in a particular manner.

=== Conjuncts ===
Another notable aspect of Hindi–Urdu grammar is that of "conjunct verbs", composed of a noun or adjective paired up with a general verbaliser, most commonly transitive karnā "to do" or intransitive honā "to be", "to happen", functioning in the place of what in English would be single unified verb. All conjunct verbs formed using karnā are transitive verbs and all conjunct verbs formed using the verb honā are intransitive verbs.

In the case of an adjective as the non-verbal element, it is often helps to think of karnā "to do" as supplementarily having the senses of "to cause to be", "to make", "to render", etc.

Adjective	Conjunct	Literal	Meaning
sāf "clean"	sāf karnā	to do clean	to clean
niyukt^{H} / muqarrar^{U} "appointed"	niyukt karnā / muqarrar karnā	to do appointed	to appoint
band "closed"	band honā	to be closed	to close (intransitive)
xatam "finished"	xatam honā	to be finished	to finish (intransitive)

In the case of a noun as the non-verbal element, it is treated syntactically as the verb's (direct) object (never taking the ko marker; governing agreement in perfective and infinitival constructions), and the semantic patient (or agent: see gālī khānā below) of the conjunct verbal expression is often expressed/marked syntactically as a genitive postposition (kā ~ ke ~ kī) of the noun.

Noun	Conjunct	Conjunct + patient	Literal	Meaning
intazār "wait"	intazār karnā	kisī kā intazār karnā	to do somebody's wait	to wait for somebody
isti'māl "use"	isti'māl karnā	fon kā isti'māl karnā	to do a phone's use	to use a phone
bāt "talk"	bāt karnā	samīr kī bāt karnā	to do Sameer's talk	to talk about Sameer
gālī "cuss/bad word"	gālī khānā	sanam kī gālī khānā	to eat a lover's curse	to be cursed out by one's own lover
tasvīr "picture"	tasvīr khīñcnā	Ibrāhīm kī tasvīr khīñcnā	to pull Ibrahim's picture	to take Ibrahim's picture

With English it is the verb stems themselves that are used. All English loan words are used by forming compound verbs in Hindi by using either honā (intransitive) or karnā (transitive).

English verb	Hindi verb stem	Conjuncts	Meaning
check	cêk	cêk honā	to be/get checked
check	cêk	cêk karnā	to check (someone/something)
bore	bor	bor honā	to be/get bored
bore	bor	bor karnā	to bore (someone)
apply	aplāi	aplāi honā	to be/get applied
apply	aplāi	aplāi karnā	to apply (for something)

=== Passive ===
The passive construction is periphrastic. It is formed from the perfective participle by addition of the auxiliary jānā "to go"; i.e. likhnā "to write" → likhā jānā "to be written". The agent is marked by the instrumental postposition se. Furthermore, both intransitive and transitive verbs may be grammatically passivized to show physical/psychological incapacity, usually in negative sentences. Lastly, intransitives often have a passive sense, or convey unintentional action.

== Syntax ==
=== Word order ===
Hindustani generally has free word order, in the sense that word order does not usually signal grammatical functions in the language. However, the default unmarked word order in Hindustani is SOV. It is neither purely left- nor right-branching, and phenomena of both types can be found. The order of constituents in sentences as a whole lacks governing "hard and fast rules", and frequent deviations can be found from normative word position, describable in terms of a small number of rules, accounting for facts beyond the pale of the label of "SOV".

- Subject precedes the direct object of the sentence if both the dative and the accusative case marks the objects of a sentence. Prescriptively, the relative position is fixed in order to make it unambiguous which is the direct object and which is the indirect object in the sentence as both the dative case and the accusative case is the same in Hindustani and are marked by the same postposition ko.
- Attributive adjectives precede the noun they qualify by default, but can also be placed after the noun, doing that usually makes the sentence sound either more poetic or gives as stronger emphasises on the attribute that the adjective describes.
- Adverbs usually can appear either before or after the verb they qualify.
- Negative markers (nahī̃, na, mat) and interrogatives precede the verb by default but can also appear after it, however the position for negation can be more flexible and the negation can occur before or after the auxiliary verbs too if the sentence has an auxiliary verb. Whenever the negation comes after the verbs instead of before the verb, it always emphasises the negation. The negation can never come before a noun.
- kyā ("what?") as the yes–no question marker occurs at the beginning or the end of a clause as its unmarked positions but it can be put anywhere in the sentence except before a verb, where it is instead interpreted as the interrogative meaning "what". This is frequently dropped in colloquial conversation, and instead, the last word of the question has a higher pitch.

In the example below, it is shown that all word orders make sense for simple sentences, which do not have adjectives, negations and adverbs. As a general rule, whatever information comes first in the sentence gets emphasised and the information which appears at the end of a sentence gets emphasised the least.

[maĩ].1P.NOM.SG [baccā].kid.NOM.SG.MASC [hū̃].be.1P.SG					[mujhe].1P.DAT [karnā].INF.PTCP.MASC.SG [hai].be.3P.SG		
	Sentence	Literal	Translation		Sentence	Literal	Translation
1.	maĩ baccā hū̃	[I] [kid] [am]	I am a kid.	2.	mujhe karnā hai	[to me] [to do] [is]	I have/want to do.
1.	maĩ hū̃ baccā	[I] [am] [kid]	I am a kid.	2.	mujhe hai karnā	[to me] [is] [to do]	I have/want to do.
1.	baccā maĩ hū̃	[kid] [I] [am]	I am a kid.	2.	karnā mujhe hai	[to do] [to me] [is]	I have/want to do.
1.	baccā hū̃ maĩ	[kid] [am] [I]	I am a kid.	2.	karnā hai mujhe	[to do] [is] [to me]	I have/want to do.
1.	hū̃ maĩ baccā	[am] [I] [kid]	I am a kid.	2.	hai mujhe karnā	[is] [to me] [to do]	I have/want to do.
1.	hū̃ baccā maĩ	[am] [kid] [I]	I am a kid.	2.	hai karnā mujhe	[is] [to do] [to me]	I have/want to do.

As long as both dative and the accusative case are not used in the sentence, the word order flexibility remains. For example, in the table below the locative and the accusative case is used in the same sentence, the word order is flexible because the markers for the locative and the accusative cases are different but in Hindustani, the marker for the accusative and the dative case are the same, which is ko for nouns and the oblique case pronouns or they have their own unique pronoun forms which are the same for dative and the accusative case.

Translation: He/she wants/have to go [up] on that.
[use].he/she.DEM.DAT [uspe].that.DEM.LOC [jānā].go.INF [hai].be.3P.SG
use uspe jānā hai	uspe use jānā hai	jānā use uspe hai	hai use uspe jān̄ā
use uspe hai jānā	uspe use hai jānā	jānā use hai uspe	hai use jān̄ā uspe
use jānā hai uspe	uspe hai use jānā	jānā hai use uspe	hai jānā use uspe
use jānā uspe hai	uspe hai jānā use	jānā hai uspe use	hai jānā uspe use
use hai uspe jānā	uspe jānā hai use	jānā uspe use hai	hai uspe use jānā
use hai jānā uspe	uspe jānā use hai	jānā uspe hai use	hai uspe jānā use
Note: All word orders make sense but each has its own nuance and specific context of usage.

Usage of dative/accusative noun + accusative/dative pronoun

When noun and pronoun are used together in a sentence and one is in accusative case while the other is in the dative case, there is no way to differentiate which one is which just by looking at the sentence. Usually in such cases, owing to the default word order of Hindi (which is SOV) which noun/pronoun comes earlier in the sentence becomes the subject of the sentence and what comes later becomes the object of the sentence.

1. [use].DEM.ACC [kutte-ko].dog.DAT [do].give.IMP.2P
2. [use].DEM.DAT [kutte-ko].dog.ACC [do].give.IMP.2P
use kutte-ko do	Either "Give it/him/her to the dog." or "Give the dog to it/him/her." (Prescriptively, what comes first becomes the subject of the sentence)
use do kutte-ko	Either "Give it/him/her to the dog." or "Give the dog to it/him/her." (Prescriptively, what comes first becomes the subject of the sentence)
kutte-ko use do	Either "Give it/him/her to the dog." or "Give the dog to it/him/her." (Prescriptively, what comes first becomes the subject of the sentence)
kutte-ko do use	Either "Give it/him/her to the dog." or "Give the dog to it/him/her." (Prescriptively, what comes first becomes the subject of the sentence)
do kutte-ko use	Either "Give it/him/her to the dog." or "Give the dog to it/him/her." (Prescriptively, what comes first becomes the subject of the sentence)
do use kutte-ko	Either "Give it/him/her to the dog." or "Give the dog to it/him/her." (Prescriptively, what comes first becomes the subject of the sentence)

Usage of dative noun + accusative noun

Nouns in Hindi are put in the dative or accusative case first having the noun in the oblique case and then by adding the postposition ko after it. However, when two nouns are used in a sentence in which one of them is in the accusative case and the other in the dative case, the sentence becomes ambiguous and stops making sense, so, to make sense of the sentence, one of the nouns (the one in the accusative case) is put into the nominative case and the other one is left as it is (in the dative case). The noun which is put into the nominative case is the direct object of the sentence and the other one (which has been left in the accusative case) is the indirect object of the sentence.

When both the nouns use the ko marker, generally, all permutations in which the nouns with the same case marker are adjacent to one another become ambiguous or convey no sense.

Sentence	Note	Translation
?sā̃p-ko sapere-ko do	with proper intonation it makes sense	give the snake to the snake-charmer.
*sā̃p-ko do sapere-ko	doesn't make sense	–
?sapere-ko sā̃p-ko do	with proper intonation it makes sense	give the snake-charmer to the snake.
*sapere-ko do sā̃p-ko	doesn't make sense	–
*do sapere-ko sā̃p-ko	doesn't make sense	–
*do sā̃p-ko sapere-ko	doesn't make sense	–

Removing the ko from the word sā̃p leaves it in the nominative case. Now, it acts as the direct object of the sentence and saperā becomes the indirect object of the sentence. The English translation becomes "Give the snake-charmer a snake." and when the opposite is done, the English translation of the sentence becomes "Give the snake a snake-charmer."

Sentence	Translation	Sentence	Translation
sā̃p sapere-ko do	Give the snake-charmer a snake	sā̃p-ko sapere do	Give the snake a snake-charmer
sā̃p do sapere-ko	Give the snake-charmer a snake	sā̃p-ko do sapere	Give the snake a snake-charmer
sapere-ko sā̃p do	Give the snake-charmer a snake	sapere sā̃p-ko do	Give the snake a snake-charmer
sapere-ko do sā̃p	Give the snake-charmer a snake	sapere do sā̃p-ko	Give the snake a snake-charmer
do sapere-ko sā̃p	Give the snake-charmer a snake	do sapere sā̃p-ko	Give the snake a snake-charmer
do sā̃p sapere-ko	Give the snake-charmer a snake	do sā̃p-ko sapere	Give the snake a snake-charmer

Usage of dative pronoun + accusative pronoun

When two pronouns are used in a sentence, all the sentences remain grammatically valid but the ambiguity of precisely telling the subject and the object of the sentence remains. However, just as we did above, converting one the pronoun into nominative case does not work for all pronouns but only for the 3rd person pronouns and doing that for any other pronoun will leave the sentence ungrammatical and without sense. The reason that this works only for the 3rd person pronoun because these are not really the "regular" 3rd person pronouns but are instead the demonstrative pronouns. Hindustani lacks the regular 3rd person pronouns and hence compensates for them by using the demonstrative pronouns.

So, the ambiguity cannot completely be removed in this case here, unless of course it is interpreted that what comes first becomes the subject of the sentence. The English translation becomes either "Give me to that/him/her/it." or "Give me that/him/her/it." depending on which pronoun appears first in the sentence.

Sentence	Translation	Sentence	Translation
mujhe use do	Give me to that/him/her/it. or Give me that/him/her/it.	mujhe vo do	Give me that.
mujhe do use	Give me to that/him/her/it. or Give me that/him/her/it.	mujhe do vo	Give me that.
do mujhe use	Give me to that/him/her/it. or Give me that/him/her/it.	do mujhe vo	Give me that.
do use mujhe	Give me to that/him/her/it. or Give me that/him/her/it.	do vo mujhe	Give me that.
use mujhe do	Give me to that/him/her/it. or Give me that/him/her/it.	vo mujhe do	Give me that.
use do mujhe	Give me to that/him/her/it. or Give me that/him/her/it.	vo do mujhe	Give me that.

=== Possession ===
Unlike English and many other Indo-European languages, Hindustani does not have a verb which uniquely translate to "to have" of English. Possession is reflected in Hindustani by the genitive marker kā (inflected appropriately) or the postposition ke pās ("near") and the verb honā. Possible objects of possession fall into the following four main categories in Hindustani,

1. Fundamental possessions: These are possessions that are of permanent nature, which one has not obtained but got naturally and cannot be owned. These include, family relations, body parts, etc.
  - For indicating fundamental possessions, kā appears after the subject of the possession. With personal pronouns, this requires the use of the possessive pronoun (inflected appropriately).
2. Non-Fundamental possessions: These are possessions that one has obtained or can be owned. These include possession of any object, living beings (including humans), etc.
  - For indicating non-fundamental possessions, the compound postposition ke pās (literally, "of near") is used. However, this postposition cannot ever be translated as "near", showing proximity.
3. Proximal possessions: These are possessions that show that someone or something has something near themselves.
  - For indicating proximity of the object to the subject, the double compound postposition ke pās mẽ (literally, "of near in") is used. It translates as "nearby".
4. Dative/Abstract possessions: These are abstract possessions such as pain, problems, issue, wanting, happiness, etc. but sometimes it can also be used to show number of children one has (given birth to and not adopted).
  - For indicating dative possessions, the pronouns in their dative case or the dative postposition ko is used.

Fundamental possessions
	Sentence	Explanation
1.	merī mā̃ hai. my mother {there is} I have a mother.	means that your mother is still alive, and hence in a fundamental way you still possess her, as in, the relationship "she is your mother" is true.
2.	uskī do ā̃khẽ haĩ. his two eyes {there are} He/She has two eyes.	means that a person fundamentally/naturally has two eyes. The person was born like that.
3.	mere do bacce haĩ. mine two children {there are} I have two children.	means you are the parent of two kids. The relationship is permanent.
4.	merī nazar acchī nahī̃ hai. mine vision good not is My vision is not good.	as vision is a fundamental property of a person and hence it cannot be owned and so the fundamental possession is used.

Note: The verb honā can be translated as "to be", "to have/possess", "to exist" or "to happen" depending on the context. The third person singular and plural conjugations depending on the context could also be translated as "there is" and "there are" respectively.

Non-fundamental possessions
	Sentence	Explanation
1.	mere pās mā̃ hai. mine near mother {there is} I have a mother.	means the same as the fundamental possession, but with the nuance that you and your mother are physically together or close.
2.	uske pās do ā̃khẽ haĩ. his near two eyes {there are} He/she has two eyes.	means the same as the fundamental possession with an emphasis on the current ability of one's eyes (as opposed to blindness), but also has an additional meaning of possession of someone else's eye.
3.	mere pās do bacce haĩ. mine near two kids {there are} I have two kids.	means that you have kids of some other person, usually used in situations of school (teacher-student), kidnapping, etc.
4.	mere pās ek idea hai. mine near one idea {there is} I have an idea.	means that you possess an idea. An idea occurred to you.

Note: Sometimes when talking about physical objects (including animals) both the fundamental and non-fundamental possessions are used interchangeably when the meaning conveyed in both cases does not lead to confusion. For example, mere do kutte haĩ and mere pās do kutte haĩ (both translating as, "I have two dogs.") are often used interchangeably when referring to pet dogs, with the sentence with the fundamental possession showing or having more emotional attachment. The reason these both are used interchangeably because it is a priori understood that the dogs in the context must be pet dogs. Same happens with the second example above on both the tables conveying the possession of eyes; it is understood that the eyes in the context are one's own. In the contexts where such a priori information is not immediately understood, these two types of possessions cannot be used interchangeably.

Proximal possessions
	Sentence
1.	mere {pās mẽ} mā̃ hai. mine nearby mother {there is} "Mother is near me." or, "I have mother near me."
2.	uske {pās mẽ} do kutte haĩ. his nearby two dogs {there are} "There are two dogs near him/her." or, "He/She/It has two dogs near him/her/it."
3.	mere {pās mẽ} do bacce haĩ. mine nearby two kids {there are} "I have two kids near me."
4.	mere {pās mẽ} ek ghar hai. mine nearby one house {there is} "I have a house near me."

Dative/Abstract possessions
	Sentence	Explanation
1.	mujhe ek dikkat hai. {to me} one problem {there is} I have a problem.	since problem is an abstract noun, the dative/abstract possession is used.
2.	use usse do bacce haĩ. {to him/her} {from him/her} two kids {there are} She has two kids with him.	dative/abstract possession is used to show number of children someone has (gave birth to, and not adopted).
3.	tujhe itnī xušī kyõ hai? {to you} {this much} happiness why {there is} Why are you so happy? (lit. why do you have so much happiness?)	since happiness is an abstract noun, the dative/abstract possession is used.

=== Relativisation ===
Rather than using relative clauses after nouns, as in English, Hindustani uses correlative clauses. In Hindustani, a correlative clause can go before or after the entire clause, the adjective, the noun, the pronoun or the verb it relativises.

Relative pronouns positions
	Sentence	Note
1.	jo laṛkī khaṛī hai vo lambī hai. who.REL girl.FEM.SG stand.PTCP.FEM.SG be.PRS.3P.SG. she.DEM tall.ADJ.FEM.SG be.PRS.3P.SG. The girl who is standing, she is tall.	pre-noun relative clause
2.	bacca jo cillātā hai bura hai. kid.MASC.SG. who.REL shout.PTCP.MASC.SG be.PRS.3P.SG bad.ADJ.MASC.SG be.PRS.3P.SG; The kid who shouts is bad.	post-noun relative clause
3.	vo khātā hai jo vo khātā hai. he.DEM eat.PTCP.MASC.SG be.PRS.3P.SG what.REL he.DEM eat.PTCP.MASC.SG be.PRS.3P.SG; He eats what he eats.	post-verb relative clause
4.	karo jo karnā hai [tumko]. do.IMP.2P.SG what.REL do.INF.PTCP be.PRS.3P.SG {} Do what you want/have to do.	pre-verb relative clause
5.	jo karo sahī karo. what.REL do.SUBJ.2P.SG correct.ADJ do.IMP.2P.SG; Do right what you do.	pre-verb relative clause
6.	acchī̃ nahī̃ haĩ vo jo gātī̃ haĩ. good.ADJ.FEM.PL not.NEG be.PRS.3P.PL they.NOM.FEM. who.REL sing.PTCP.FEM.PL be.PRS.3P.PL; Those [women] who sing are not good.	post-pronoun relative clause
7.	jo tum karoge sahī karoge. what.REL you.NOM do.FUT.MASC.2P.SG correct.ADJ do.FUT.MASC.2P.SG; What(ever) you'll do, you'll do correct(ly)/right.	pre-pronoun relative clause
8.	acchī jo haī vo vo laṛkī haī. good.ADJ.FEM.SG who.REL be.PRS.3P.SG she.DEM that.DEM girl.NOM.SG. be.PRS.3P.SG. The girl who is good is her.	post-adjective relative clause
9.	jo acchī haī vo vo laṛkī haī. who.REL good.ADJ.FEM.SG be.PRS.3P.SG that.DEM she.DEM girl.NOM.SG. be.PRS.3P.SG. The girl who is good is her.	pre-adjective relative clause

Note: The relative pronoun jo can be used as both relative "what" and relative "who".

=== Case-marking and verb agreement ===
Hindustani has tripartite case-marking, which means that the subject in intransitive clauses, and the agent and the object in transitive clauses each can be marked by a distinct case form. The full set of case distinctions is however only realized in certain clause types.

In intransitive clauses, the subject is in nominative case. The verb displays agreement with the subject: depending on aspect and mood, the verb agrees in gender and number, and/or person and number.

laṛkā kal āyā
boy:NOM yesterday come:PRF:MASC:SG
'The boy came yesterday.'

In transitive clauses, there are three patterns:

1. Perfective clauses with animate/definite object

Fully distinctive case marking is found in perfective clauses with animate and/or definite objects. Here, the agent takes the ergative case marker ne, while the object takes the accusative case marker ko. The verb does not agree with either of the core arguments (agent and object), but is marked per default as third person masculine singular (calāyā hai). (Note: In the sample clause, the agent happens to be masculine singular, but the verb would not change even if the agent were plural or feminine.)

laṛke=ne gāṛī=ko calāyā hai
boy:OBL=ERG car=ACC drive:PRF:MASC:SG be:PRES:3.SG
'The boy has driven the car.'

2. Perfective clauses with inanimate/indefinite object

In perfective clauses with an indefinite object, the agent keeps the ergative case marker, but the object is in nominative case. The verb agrees with the object: the perfective form calāyī hai is marked for feminine gender, agreeing with the gender of the object gāṛī.

laṛke=ne gāṛī calāyī hai
boy:OBL=ERG car drive:PRF:FEM:SG be:PRES:3.SG
'The boy has driven a car.'

3. Non-perfective clauses

In all other clause types, the agent is in nominative case and triggers agreement on the verb. The object is either in nominative case or accusative case, depending on animacy/definiteness

laṛkā gāṛī calātā hai
boy:NOM car:NOM drive:IMPF:MASC:SG be:PRES:3.SG
'The boy drives a car.'

The following table summarises the three basic case-marking and agreement types.

		Case marking			Verb agreement	
		S*	A	O	transitive	intransitive
Perfective clauses	definite object	nominative	ergative	accusative	none	with S
Perfective clauses	indefinite object	nominative	ergative	nominative	with O	with S
Non-perfective clauses		nominative	nominative	nominative/accusative	with A	with S
*S is the subject in intransitive clauses. A and O are the agent and the object in transitive clauses, respectively.

==== Differential argument marking ====
Hindustani, like other Indo-Aryan languages, displays differential case marking on both subjects (DSM) and objects (DOM). Diachronically, differential argument marking developed very differently for subjects and objects, but became prevalent for both in the 17th century. For subjects, it is predicate-licensed and dependent on semantics, whereas for objects it is discourse-driven.

For subjects, on top of the previously discussed split ergativity (in which perfective case verbs take the ergative ne on the subject, while other conjugations have an unmarked subject), certain modal auxiliary verbs take different case markers for their subjects.

The most notable instance of DSM is the experiencer dative subject (a type of quirky subject). Verbs indicating sensations (lagnā "to seem"), emotions (mahsūs honā "to feel"), and cognition (patā honā "to be known"), all license the dative case marker ko on their subjects. This is a cross-linguistic phenomenon.

us=ko terī bāt acchī lag rahī hai
3.SG:OBL=DAT 2.SG:GEN talk:NOM good:FEM seem PROG:FEM be:3.SG:PRS
'She likes what you're saying.'

Passive subjects taking the modal auxiliary jānā 'to go', usually connoting reduced agentivity, take the instrumental se. This construction can also be used to indicate ability.

bacce=se śīśā ṭūṭ gayā
child:OBL=INS mirror:NOM break go:PRF:MASC:SG
'The mirror was broken by the child.'

The dative ko indicates obligation or necessity. The modal honā 'to be' and paṛnā 'to fall' both take this on their subjects.

logõ=ko kām karnā hai
people:OBL:PL=DAT work:NOM do:INF be:PRS:3.SG
'The people have to work.'

The accusative marker ko is only applied when the object is definite, similar to the distinction between the and a(n) in English.

maĩ=ne laṛkõ=ko bacāyā
1.SG=ERG boy:OBL:PL=ACC save:PRF:MASC:SG
'I saved the boys.'

maĩ=ne laṛke bacāye
1.SG=ERG boy:NOM:PL save:PRF:MASC:PL
'I saved boys.'

== See also ==
- Hindustani verbs
- Hindustani pronouns
- Hindi language
- Urdu language
- Devanagari
- Devanagari transliteration
- Urdu alphabet
- Roman Urdu
- Hindustani phonology

== Bibliography ==
- Masica, Colin (1991), The Indo-Aryan Languages, Cambridge: Cambridge University Press, ISBN 978-0-521-29944-2.
- Schmidt, Ruth Laila (2003), "Urdu", in Cardona, George; Jain, Dhanesh (eds.), The Indo-Aryan Languages, Routledge, pp. 286–350, ISBN 978-0-415-77294-5.
- McGregor, Ronald Stuart (1995), Outline of Hindi Grammar (third ed.), Oxford: Clarendon Press, ISBN 0-19-870008-3.
- Shapiro, Michael C. (2003), "Hindi", in Cardona, George; Jain, Dhanesh (eds.), The Indo-Aryan Languages, Routledge, pp. 250–285, ISBN 978-0-415-77294-5.
- Snell, Rupert; Weightman, Simon (1989), Teach Yourself Hindi (2003 ed.), McGraw-Hill, ISBN 978-0-07-142012-9.
