= Equative case =

Grammatical case

The equative case (abbreviated EQU) is a grammatical case prototypically expressing the standard of comparison of equal values ("as… as…"). The equative case has been used in very few languages in history. It was used in the Sumerian language, where it also took on the semantic functions of the essive case ("in the capacity of…") and similative case ("like a…").

In Sumerian, the equative was formed by adding the suffix -gin_{7} to a noun phrase, for example:

lugal → lugal-gin_{7}
"king" {} {"king-like", "like a king"}

nitah-kalaga → nitah-kalaga-gin_{7}
{"mighty man"} {} {"like a mighty man"}

In Ossetic, it is formed by adding the suffix -ау [aw]:

фӕт → фӕтау
"arrow" {} "arrowlike"

Ницы фенӕгау йӕхи акодта
lit. "nothingseer-like himself made" ("[he or she] pretended to see nothing").

The equative case is also found subdialectally in the Khalkha dialect of Mongolian, where it can be formed by adding the suffixes -цаа [tsaa], -цоо [tsoo], -цээ [tsee] or -цөө [tsöö], depending on the vowel harmony of the noun. It is rare and highly specialized, used exclusively to denote the height or level of an object:

эрэг → эрэгцээ
"[river]bank" {} {"as high as the bank"}

өвдөг → өвдөгцөө
"knee(s)" {} {"up to the height of the knee(s)"}

In Archi, a Northeast Caucasian language, the equative case is indicated by the case marker -qʼdi:

misgin-ni-qʼdi
poor-OBL-EQU
"In the way of the poor."

It is also found in the Turkic Khalaj language and in languages from South America such as Quechua, Aymara, Uro and Cholón.

Sireniki Eskimo had an equative (or comparative) case for describing similarities between nouns.

== See also ==
- Comparative case
- Semblative case
- List of grammatical cases
