= Pronouns in Hindi =

Words in Hindi that substitute for a noun or noun phrase

The personal pronouns and possessives in Modern Standard Hindi of the Hindustani language display a higher degree of inflection than other parts of speech. Personal pronouns have distinct forms according to whether they stand for a subject (nominative), a direct object (accusative), an indirect object (dative), or a reflexive object. Pronouns further have special forms and indicate more cases using postpositions.

The possessive pronouns are the same as the possessive adjectives, but each is inflected to express the grammatical person of the possessor and the grammatical gender of the possessed.

Pronoun use displays considerable variation with register and dialect, with particularly pronoun preference differences between the most colloquial varieties of Hindi.

== Postpositions ==
The function of case marking in Hindi is done exclusively by postpositions. The pronouns of Hindi can be declined into 10 cases as shown below, as well as the nominative and the oblique (this is used to make the accusative and the dative). The oblique and ergative case is used with the case marking postpositions to form the ergative, accusative/dative, instrumental/ablative, genitive, inessive, adessive, terminative, and semblative cases. The postpositions are considered to be bound morphemes to the pronouns. The eight primary postpositions of Hindi are mentioned in the table below:

Case Marker	Postposition	Explanation	Example	English
Ergative	ने (ne)	marks the subject of the sentence	इसने (isne)	he/she
Accusative	को (ko)	marks the receiver of an action	इसको (isko)	him/her
Dative	को (ko)	marks the indirect object; can also mark the subject (quirky subject)	इसको (isko)	to him/her
Instrumental	से (se)	marks the object with/using which the action was done	इससे (isse)	with him/her
Ablative	से (se)	shows movement away from the object	इससे (isse)	from him/her
Genitive	का (kā)	shows possession	इसका (iskā)	his/her(s)
Inessive	में (mẽ)	shows something is in/inside something	इसमें (ismẽ)	in him/her
Adessive	पे / पर (pe / par)	shows something is on/at something	इसपे (ispe)	on him/her
Terminative	तक (tak)	shows something goes up to the object	इसतक (istak)	till him/her
Semblative	सा (sā)	shows resemblance	इससा (issā)	like him/her

Note:

- The pronoun इस (is), which is the oblique case of the nominative demonstrative pronoun यह (yah), can be translated as he, she, it, and this.
- The postpositions which end in the vowel ा (-ā) (which are the genitive and semblative postpositions) can further decline according to gender, number, and grammatical case of the noun it describes. The declension of postpositions follows the following declension by changing their end vowels:

Declension Pattern
Case	Masculine		Feminine	
Case	Singular	Plural	Singular	Plural
Nominative	ा -ā	े -e	ी -ī	
Oblique	े -e		ी -ī	

Genitive Marker
Case	Masculine		Feminine	
Case	Singular	Plural	Singular	Plural
Nominative	का kā	के ke	की kī	
Oblique	के ke		की kī	

Semblative Marker
Case	Masculine		Feminine	
Case	Singular	Plural	Singular	Plural
Nominative	सा sā	से se	सी sī	
Oblique	से se		सी sī	

== Personal pronouns ==
Hindi has personal pronouns in the first and second person, but not the third person, where demonstratives are used instead. They are inflected for case and number (singular and plural), but not for gender. Pronouns decline for four grammatical cases in Hindi: The nominative case, the accusative/dative case and two postpositional cases, the oblique and ergative cases. The second person pronouns have three levels of formality: intimate, familiar, and formal. As also done in many other Indo-European languages, the plural pronouns are used as singular polite or formal pronouns.

Case		1st Person		2nd Person		
Case		Singular	Plural	Intimate	Familiar	Formal
Case		Singular	Plural	Singular	Plural	
Nominative		मैं mãĩ	हम ham	तू tū	तुम tum	आप āp
Oblique	Ergative	मैं mãĩ	हम ham	तू tū	तुम tum	आप āp
Oblique	Regular	मुझ mujh	हम ham	तुझ tujh	तुम tum	आप āp
Oblique	Regular (Emphatic)	मुझी mujhī	हमीं hamī̃	तुझी tujhī	तुम्हीं tumhī̃	—
Oblique	Ergative (Emphatic)	—	हमीं hamī̃	—	तुम्हीं tumhī̃	—
Accusative		मुझे mujhe	हमें hamẽ	तुझे tujhe	तुम्हें tumhẽ	—
Dative		मुझे mujhe	हमें hamẽ	तुझे tujhe	तुम्हें tumhẽ	—

Postpositional Pronouns using the Oblique/Ergative Cases
Case	1st Person		2nd Person		
Case	Singular	Plural	Intimate	Familiar	Formal
Case	Singular	Plural	Singular	Plural	
Ergative	मैंने mãĩne	हमने hamne	तूने tūne	तुमने tumne	आपने āpne
Accusative	मुझको mujhko	हमको hamko	तुझको tujhko	तुमको tumko	आपको āpko
Dative	मुझको mujhko	हमको hamko	तुझको tujhko	तुमको tumko	आपको āpko
Instrumental	मुझसे mujhse	हमसे hamse	तुझसे tujhse	तुमसे tumse	आपसे āpse
Ablative	मुझसे mujhse	हमसे hamse	तुझसे tujhse	तुमसे tumse	आपसे āpse
Genitive	—	—	—	—	आपका āpkā
Inessive	मुझमें mujhmẽ	हममें hammẽ	तुझमें tujhmẽ	तुममें tummẽ	आपमें āpmẽ
Adessive	मुझपे mujhpe	हमपे hampe	तुझपे tujhpe	तुमपे tumpe	आपपे āppe
Terminative	मुझतक mujhtak	हमतक hamtak	तुझतक tujhtak	तुमतक tumtak	आपतक āptak
Semblative	मुझसा mujhsā	हमसा hamsā	तुझसा tujhsā	तुमसा tumsā	आपसा āpsā

Note:

- In the eastern dialects of Hindi, the pronoun हम ham is used as both the first person singular and plural pronoun. When plurality is to be implied then words such as लोग log (people), सब sab (all) are added after the pronoun.
- True genitive pronouns exist for the personal pronouns (except आप āp), and they cannot be constructed from the oblique cases; they are discussed in the 'Possessive Pronouns' section below.
- The emphasised oblique case for the pronoun आप (āp) is constructed periphrastically using the exclusive emphatic particle ही (hī), which is आप ही (āp hī). Although pronounced the same as आफी (āphī), it is never written like that.

== Demonstrative, interrogative, and relative pronouns ==
Just like Sanskrit, Hindi does not have true third person pronouns, but its demonstratives play their role when they stand independently of a substantive. The demonstrative pronouns just like the personal pronouns can be declined into the nominative, ergative, accusative/dative and the oblique case.

The relative and the interrogative pronouns can be constructed for the non-nominative cases by just changing the first consonant of the demonstrative pronouns to ज (j) and क (k) respectively.

Case		Demonstrative				Interrogative		Relative	
Case		Proximal		Non-proximal		Singular	Plural	Singular	Plural
Case		Singular	Plural	Singular	Plural	Singular	Plural	Singular	Plural
Nominative	Literary	यह yah	ये ye	वह vah	वे ve	क्या,कौन kyā, kaun		जो jo	
Nominative	Colloquial	ये ye		वो vo		क्या,कौन kyā, kaun		जो jo	
Nominative	Emphatic	यही yahī		वही vahī		—	—	(जो भी) (jo bhī)	
Accusative		इसे ise	इन्हें inhẽ	उसे use	उन्हें unhẽ	किसे kise	किन्हें kinhẽ	जिसे jise	जिन्हें jinhẽ
Dative		इसे ise	इन्हें inhẽ	उसे use	उन्हें unhẽ	किसे kise	किन्हें kinhẽ	जिसे jise	जिन्हें jinhẽ
Oblique	Regular	इस is	इन in	उस us	उन un	किस kis	किन kin	जिस jis	जिन jin
Oblique	Ergative	इस is	इन्हों inhõ	उस us	उन्हों unhõ	किस kis	किन्हों kinhõ	जिस jis	जिन्हों jinhõ
Oblique	Emphatic	इसी isī	इन्हीं inhī̃	उसी usī	उन्हीं unhī̃	किसी kisī	किन्हीं kinhī̃	—	—

Postpositional Pronouns using the Oblique & Ergative Cases
Case	Demonstrative				Interrogative		Relative	
Case	Proximal		Non-proximal		Singular	Plural	Singular	Plural
Case	Singular	Plural	Singular	Plural	Singular	Plural	Singular	Plural
Ergative	इसने isne	इन्होंने inhõne	उसने usne	उन्होंने unhõne	किसने kisne	किन्होंने kinhõne	जिसने jisne	जिन्होंने jinhõne
Accusative	इसको isko	इनको inko	उसको usko	उनको unko	किसको kisko	किनको kinko	जिसको jisko	जिनको jinko
Dative	इसको isko	इनको inko	उसको usko	उनको unko	किसको kisko	किनको kinko	जिसको jisko	जिनको jinko
Instrumental	इससे isse	इनसे inse	उससे usse	उनसे unse	किससे kisse	किनसे kinse	जिससे jisse	जिनसे kinse
Ablative	इससे isse	इनसे inse	उससे usse	उनसे unse	किससे kisse	किनसे kinse	जिससे jisse	जिनसे kinse
Genitive	इसका iskā	इनका inkā	उसका uskā	उनका unkā	किसका kiskā	किनका kinkā	जिसका jiskā	जिनका jinkā
Inessive	इसमें ismẽ	इनमें inmẽ	उसमें usmẽ	उनमें unmẽ	किसमें kismẽ	किनमें kinmẽ	जिसमें jismẽ	जिनमें jinmẽ
Adessive	इसपे ispe	इनपे inpe	उसपे uspe	उनपे unpe	किसपे kispe	किनपे kinpe	जिसपे jispe	जिनपे jinpe
Terminative	इसतक istak	इनतक intak	उसतक ustak	उनतक untak	किसतक kistak	किनतक kintak	जिसतक jistak	जिनतक jintak
Semblative	इससा issa	इनसा insa	उससा ussa	उनसा unsa	किससा kissa	किनसा kinsa	जिससा jissa	जिनसा jinsa

Notes:

- The ergative case is predominantly used with animate nouns.
- कौन kaun is the animate interrogative and क्या kyā is the inanimate interrogative.
- जो is used as both the animate and inanimate relative pronoun.
- The genitive and semblative postpositions decline to agree with the number, gender, and case of the object it possesses or describes, respectively.

== Possessive pronouns ==
The possessive pronouns are the same as the possessive adjectives, but each is inflected to express the grammatical person of the possessor and the grammatical gender of the possessed. Unlike the personal pronouns (except for आप), there are no true possessive pronoun forms for the demonstrative pronouns. So, the demonstrative, interrogative, and relative possessive pronouns are formed using oblique case with the postposition का (kā).

Person		Nominative	Genitive					
Person		Nominative	Masculine			Feminine		
Person		Nominative	Singular	Plural	Oblique	Singular	Plural	Oblique
1st Person		मैं mãĩ	मेरा merā	मेरे mere		मेरी merī		
1st Person		हम ham	हमारा hamārā	हमारे hamāre		हमारी hamārī		
2nd Person	Intimate	तू tū	तेरा terā	तेरे tere		तेरी terī		
2nd Person	Familiar	तुम tum	तुम्हारा tumhārā	तुम्हारे tumhāre		तुम्हारी tumhārī		
2nd Person	Formal	आप āp	आपका āpkā	आपके āpke		आपकी āpkī		

Person			Nominative		Genitive					
Person			Nominative		Masculine			Feminine		
Person			Nominative		Singular	Plural	Oblique	Singular	Plural	Oblique
Demonstrative	Proximal	Singular	यह yah	ये ye	इसका iskā	इसके iske		इसकी iskī		
Demonstrative	Proximal	Plural	ये ye	ये ye	इनका inkā	इनके inke		इनकी inkī		
Demonstrative	Distal	Singular	वह vah	वो vo	उसका uskā	उसके uske		उसकी uskī		
Demonstrative	Distal	Plural	वे ve	वो vo	उनका unkā	उनके unke		उनकी unkī		
Interrogative	Singular		कौन, क्या kaun, kyā		किसका kiskā	किसके kiske		किसकी kiskī		
Interrogative	Plural		कौन, क्या kaun, kyā		किनका kinkā	किनके kinke		किनकी kinkī		
Relative	Singular		जो, सो jo, so		जिसका jiskā	जिसके jiske		जिसकी jiskī		
Relative	Plural		जो, सो jo, so		जिनका jinkā	जिनके jinke		जिनकी jinkī		

- The possessive pronouns and the genitive postposition का (kā) decline to agree with the number, gender, and case of the possessed object.
- In colloquial usage, जो (jo) functions as both an animate and inanimate relative pronoun. सो (so) (inanimate relative pronoun) is also sometimes used but in a limited manner.

== Reflexive pronouns ==
There are several words in Hindi that function as reflexive pronouns. The indeclinable स्वयं (svayam) can indicate reflexivity pertaining to subjects of any person or number, and—since subjects in Hindi can appear in the nominative, or dative cases—it can have the sense of any of these two cases.

- ख़ुद (khud) and स्वयं (svayam) are indeclinable reflexive pronouns.
- अपना (apnā) is a declinable reflexive pronoun.

Case			Masculine		Feminine	
Case			Singular	Plural	Singular	Plural
Declinable	Nominative		अपना apnā	अपने apne	अपनी apnī	
Declinable	Oblique	with noun	अपने apne		अपनी apnī	
Declinable	Oblique	sans noun	अपने apne	अपनों apnõ	अपनी apnī	अप्नियों apniyõ
Undeclinable	Nominative		ख़ुद khud			
Undeclinable	Oblique		ख़ुद khud			
Undeclinable	Nominative		स्वयं svayam			
Undeclinable	Oblique		स्वयं svayam			

== Indefinite pronouns ==
There are two indefinite pronouns in Hindi: कोई koī (someone, somebody) and कुछ kuch (something). कुछ kuch is also used as an adjective (numeral and quantitative) and as an adverb meaning ‘some, a few, a little, partly.’ Similarly, कोई koī can be used as an adverb in the sense of ‘some, about.’ When it is used with the semblative postposition सा sā, the pronoun कोई सा koī sā (of some kind, some, something) is formed. The indefinite pronouns of Hindi are mentioned in the table below:

Case		Animate	Inanimate	Animate	Inanimate	Animate	Inanimate
Case		Singular		Plural (some)		Plural (several)	
Nominative		कोई koī	कुछ kuch			कई kaī	
Oblique	with noun	किसी kisī		कुछ kuch		कई kaī	
Oblique	sans noun	किसी kisī		किन्हीं kinhī̃	कुछों kuchõ	कइयों kaīyõ	

Note: The animate plural forms are also used as formal animate singular forms.

== Adverbial pronouns ==
Adverbial pronouns of Hindi and the declension pattern of the declinable pronouns are mentioned in the table below:

		Interrogative	Relative	Demonstrative	
		Interrogative	Relative	Proximal	Non-proximal
Undeclinable	Time	कब kab	जब jab	अब ab	तब tab
Undeclinable	Direction	किधर kidhar	जिधर jidhar	इधर idhar	उधर udhar
Undeclinable	Place	कहाँ kahā̃	जहाँ jahā̃	यहाँ yahā̃	वहाँ vahā̃
Undeclinable	Manner	कैसे kaise	जैसे jaise	ऐसे aise	वैसे vaise
Declinable	Quantity	कितना kitnā	जितना jitnā	इतना itnā	उतना utnā
Declinable	Quality	कैसा kaisā	जैसा jaisā	ऐसा aisā	वैसा vaisā

Declension Pattern
Case		Masculine		Feminine	
Case		Singular	Plural	Singular	Plural
Nominative		ा -ā	े -e	ी -ī	
Oblique	with noun	े -e		ी -ī	
Oblique	sans noun	े -e	ों -õ	ी -ī	ियों -iyõ

Declension for कितना (kitnā) [how much?]
Case		Masculine		Feminine	
Case		Singular	Plural	Singular	Plural
Nominative		कितना kitnā	कितने kitne	कितनी kitnī	
Oblique	with noun	कितने kitne		कितनी kitnī	
Oblique	sans noun	कितने kitne	कितनों kitnõ	कितनी kitnī	कितनियों kitniyõ

== Bibliography ==
- Schmidt, Hans (2003). "Temathesis in Rotuman" (PDF). In John Lynch (ed.). Issues in Austronesian Historical Phonology. Pacific Linguistics Research School of Pacific and Asian Studies. pp. 175–207. ISBN 978-0-85883-503-0.
- Shapiro, Michael C. (2003). "Hindi". In Cardona, George; Jain, Dhanesh (eds.). The Indo-Aryan Languages. Routledge. pp. 250–285. ISBN 978-0-415-77294-5.
- Snell, Rupert; Weightman, Simon (1989). Teach Yourself Hindi (2003 ed.). McGraw-Hill. ISBN 978-0-07-142012-9.
