= Quirky subject =

Linguistic phenomenon

In linguistics, quirky subjects (also called oblique subjects) are a phenomenon where certain verbs specify that their subjects are to be in a case other than the nominative. These non-nominative subjects are determiner phrases that pass subjecthood tests such as subject-oriented anaphora binding, PRO control, reduced relative clause, conjunction reduction, subject-to-subject raising, and subject-to-object raising.

It has been observed cross-linguistically that the subject of a sentence often has a nominative case. However, this one-to-one relationship between case and grammatical relations (subjecthood) is highly debatable. Some argue that nominative case marking and controlling verb agreement are not unique properties of subjects. One piece of evidence in support of this proposal is the observation that nominative can also mark left-dislocated NPs, appellatives and some objects in the active in Icelandic. In addition, agreeing predicate NPs can also be marked nominative case:

María er snillingur
Mary.NOM is genius.NOM

In Standard English, a sentence like "*Me like him" is ungrammatical because the subject is ordinarily in the nominative case. In many or most nominative–accusative languages, this rule is inflexible: the subject is indeed in the nominative case, and almost all treat the subjects of all verbs the same. Icelandic was argued to be the only modern language with quirky subjects, but other studies investigating languages like Basque, Faroese, German, Gujarati, Hindi, Hungarian, Kannada, Korean, Laz, Malayalam, Marathi, Russian, Spanish, and Telugu show that they also possess quirky subjects.

The class of quirky subjects in Icelandic is a large one, consisting of hundreds of verbs in a number of distinct classes: experiencer verbs like vanta (need/lack), motion verbs like reka (drift), change of state verbs like ysta (curdle), verbs of success/failure like takast (succeed/manage to), verbs of acquisition like áskotnast (acquire/get by luck), and many others.

In superficially similar constructions of the type seen in Spanish me gusta "I like", the analogous part of speech (in this case me) is not a true syntactical subject. "Me" is instead the object of the verb "gusta" which has a meaning closer to "please", thus, "me gusta" could be translated as "(he/she/it) pleases me" or "I am pleased by [x]."

Many linguists, especially from various persuasions of the broad school of cognitive linguistics, do not use the term "quirky subjects" since the term is biased towards languages of nominative–accusative type. Often, "quirky subjects" are semantically motivated by the predicates of their clauses. Dative-subjects, for example, quite often correspond with predicates indicating sensory, cognitive, or experiential states across a large number of languages. In some cases, this can be seen as evidence for the influence of active–stative typology.

In ergative–absolutive languages, the absolutive case is not considered a quirky subject, because it functions as the default, structurally unmarked case for the subjects of intransitive verbs and the objects of transitive verbs. However, in languages with split ergativity based on tense or aspect—such as Middle Persian and Kurdish—the alignment reverses in the past tense: the logical agent appears in the ergative case, while the argument in the absolutive position acquires core syntactic properties typically associated with subjects (such as agreement and control). In these systems, the absolutive argument is not the canonical subject from a morphological perspective, yet it behaves like one syntactically, and therefore it can be analyzed as a form of quirky subject within a split-ergative alignment.

== Subjecthood tests ==
Generally, nominative subjects satisfy tests that prove their "subject" status. Quirky subjects were also found to pass these subjecthood tests.

=== Subject-oriented anaphora binding ===
Some anaphors only allow subjects to be their antecedents when bound. This is also called reflexivization. Subject-oriented anaphoras (SOA) are a special subclass of anaphora that must have subjects as their antecedents. This test shows that an XP is a subject if it binds to a subject-oriented anaphora. In Icelandic, this is shown below where the dative pronoun subject Honum is only grammatical when binding the anaphor sínum:

Honum_{i} var oft hjálpað af foreldrum sínum_{i}/*hans_{i}
he.DAT was often helped by parents his.[+REFL]/his.[-REFL]
'He was often helped by his parents.'

Faroese quirky subjects also pass this diagnostic where the subject Kjartani in the dative binds the anaphor sini:

Kjartani_{i} dámar væl nýggja bil sini_{i}
Kjartin.DAT likes well new car REFL
'Kjartin likes his new car.'

The same behavior is seen in quirky subjects in Basque where the dative subject Joni binds the anaphor bere burua:

Jon-i_{i} [bere buru-a]_{i} gusta-tzen zaio
Jon-DAT his head-DET.NOM like-IPFV AUX(3SG.ABS-3SG.DAT)
'Jon likes himself'

In German, the dative DP subject Dem Fritz binds the anaphor sich:

[Dem Fritz]_{i} gefällt das Bild von sich_{i}
the.DAT Fritz likes the.NOM picture of REFL
'Fritz likes the picture of himself'

Quirky subjects in Hindi also pass this test where the dative subject मुझे (mujhe) binds the anaphor (the reflexive possessive pronoun) अपना (apnā):

मुझे अपने सब रिश्तेदार पसंद हैं
mujhe_{i} apne_{i} sab rishtedār pasand haiṁ
I.DAT REFL.MASC.PL all.NOM relatives.MASC like be.PRS.PL
'I like all my relatives'

मुझे अपनी चीज़ें लानी हैं
mujhe_{i} apni_{i} cīzeṁ lānī haiṁ
I.DAT REFL.FEM.PL things.NOM.FEM.PL bring.INF.PTCP.FEM.PL be.PRS.PL
'I have/want to bring my things.'

=== PRO control ===
Generally, PRO is the subject in the underlying structure of an embedded phrase be it subject-controlled, object-controlled, or arbitrarily-controlled. A subject can show up in a non-overt form in infinitives as PRO, but a preposed object cannot. This diagnostic shows that an XP is a subject if it can be PRO. To illustrate, Icelandic shows subject-controlled PRO with a nominative DP:

Ég_{i} vonast til [PRO_{i} að vanta ekki peninga]
I.NOM hope for PRO.ACC to lack not money.ACC
'I hope not to lack money'

Similarly, in Laz, the same can be seen:

Bere-k_{i} PRO_{i} layç’-epe o-limb-u gor-um-s ama a-s̹k’urin-en
child-ERG PRO.DAT dog-PL.NOM NMLZ-love-3.ERG want-IPFV-3 but APPL-fear-IPFV-3
'The child wants to love the dogs, but s/he fears'

=== Reduced relatives ===
A reduced relative may only appear in as a subject position in a reduced relative clause. This test shows that a constituent is a subject if it can be relativized in a reduced relative clause.

Icelandic quirky subjects are not able to be relativized on:

*[_____{i} ekni] bíll-inn
____.DAT driven car-the.NOM
'Intended: the driven car'

Laz quirky subjects are able to be relativized on:

*[_____{i} ma] limb-eri berei
____.DAT 1.NOM love.PTCP child.NOM
'the child who loved me'

=== Subject-to-object raising ===
In Icelandic, some verbs (e.g., telja, álíta) can have their complement in the 'Exceptional Case Marking' (ECM), also known as the 'Accusativus-cum-Infinitivo' (AcI) or 'Subject-to-Object Raising' (SOR) construction. It has been proposed that some non-subject (e.g. a preposed object) cannot be so embedded. The ECM construction occurs when a sentence of the form subject-finite verb-X is selected by verbs such as telja, álíta as a CP complement (embedded clause). The nominative subject shows up in the accusative (or else in the dative or genitive) in ECM construction and the verb is in the infinitive.

Ég tel álfinn hafa stolið ostinum
I.NOM believe elf-the.ACC have.INF stolen cheese-the.DAT
I believe the elf to have stolen the cheese.

Note: The object ostinum cannot be embedded in ECM construction. The following sentence is ungrammatical:

*Ég tel ostinum hafa álfurinn stolið
I.NOM believe cheese-the.DAT have.INF elf-the.NOM stolen
I believe the elf to have stolen the cheese.

An example of subject-to-object raising in German:

Ich sehe ihn_{i} t_{i} das Haus verlassen
I.NOM see he.ACC {} the house.ACC leave
I see him leave the house.

=== Conjunction reduction ===
The conjunction reduction test is also known as the subject ellipsis test. In coordinated structures, the subject of the second conjunct can be left out if it is coreferential (i.e., coindexed) with the subject in the first conjunct but not if it is coreferential with the object:

Álfurinn_{i} stal ostinum og e_{i} bauð bræðrum sínum í mat
Elf-the.NOM stole cheese-the.DAT and e invited brothers his.REFL to dinner
The elf stole the cheese and (he) invited his brothers to dinner.

The following example is ungrammatical:

*Ég hitti álfinn_{i} og e_{i} bauð mér í mat
I.NOM met elf-the.ACC and e invited me to dinner
I met the elf and he invited me to dinner.

== Quirky Subject Hierarchy ==
The Quirky Subject Hierarchy (QSH) exists to governs non-nominative subjects based on three subjecthood tests.

Quirky Subject Hierarchy
Subjecthood Tests	Laz	Icelandic	Hindi	German	Basque
Reduced Relatives	✓	x	x	x	x
PRO Control	✓	✓	x	x	x
Subject-Oriented Anaphora Binding	✓	✓	✓	✓	✓

This hierarchy shows that:

1. if a quirky subject passes the reduced relative clause test, it will also pass PRO control and subject-oriented anaphora (SOA) binding, and
2. If a quirky subject passes PRO control, then it will also pass SOA binding.

Cross-linguistically, all quirky subjects pass SOA binding test. The QSH governs quirky subjects in Icelandic, Hindi, German, Basque, Laz, Faroese, Gujarati, Hungarian, Kannada, Korean, Malayalam, Marathi, Russian, Spanish, and Telugu.

== Proposed analyses ==
Quirky subjects are analyzed to determine what case a subject may bear. There are many approaches, though the two most prominent are the standard Analysis and the Height Conjecture Analysis.

=== Standard analysis ===
In the standard analysis, quirky subjects are treated as regular subjects that are assigned lexical or idiosyncratic cases. Dative-marked nominals are often analyzed as subjects because they pass most subjecthood tests. By passing these tests, quirky subjects seem to bear the lexical case (cannot be overwritten), while non-quirky subjects bear the structural case (can be overwritten). This approach is most often used to analyze Icelandic, as all of its quirky subjects bear the lexical case and cannot be overwritten. However, the standard analysis does not sufficiently explain why lexical cases are overwritten in several languages, such as Faroese and Imbabura Quechua.

Unlike Icelandic, Faroese does not possess passive quirky subjects. Instead, passivized direct objects appear in the nominative:

{√ Hann /} {* honum} bleiv hjálpin
he.NOM he.DAT becomes helped
He is helped.

Furthermore, quirky subjects do not retain its case under raising in Faroese. In the following example, the subject Jógvan changes from the dative case to the accusative case after it is raised:

Jógvan tørvaði ein nýggjan bil
Jógvan.DAT needed a new car
Jógvan needed a new car.

Eg helt Jógvan_{i} t_{i} tørva ein nýggjan bil
I.NOM believe Jógvan.ACC {} need a new car
I believed Jógvan to need a new car.

The arc pair grammar (multistratal analysis) was proposed to explain why quirky subjects overwrite the lexical in languages such as Faroese. This analysis suggests that quirky subjects are the result of inversion: an initial subject is demoted to an indirect object, and subject properties are not tied to final subjects but can make reference to subjects at a distinct strata.

=== Height conjecture ===
In height conjecture analysis, a quirky subject gains the properties of a Focus Phrase (FP) whenever it lands in the specifier (SPEC) of that FP.

To account for the quirky subject hierarchy: TP is split into PerspP and BP

1. T is split into 2 heads Persp then B; the former to bear PRO and the latter to bind to SOA # The heads are marked [⋆nom⋆] (nominative DPs only), [⋆dep⋆] (dependent-case and nominative DPs), and [⋆d⋆] (any DP). A subject can pass through both [SPEC, Persp] and [SPEC, B], or only [SPEC, B]
2. If the head B agrees with the QS, they merge. If B and the QS merge successfully, the same merging occurs if head Persp agrees with the QS.

The raising of PRO to [SPEC, Persp] determines whether the quirky can occur in complement during control. This is according to the Perspectival Centre Constraint. If the quirky subject lands at [SPEC, Persp], it may be relativized on into a reduced relative clause.

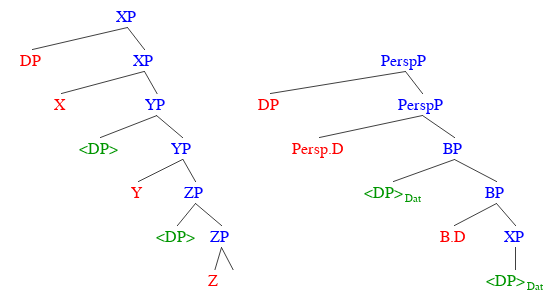
(Left) When the DP raises to [SPEC, ZP], then to [SPEC, YP] until [SPEC, XP], it accumulates the properties x, y, and z.(Right) Behavior of Icelandic-like quirky subjects

== Other examples of quirky subjects ==
In Icelandic, verbs can require a non-nominative subject. The following examples show an accusative subject and a dative subject, respectively.

Mig vantar peninga
I.ACC need money.ACC
I need money.

Quirky subjects can also occur when verbs taking a dative or genitive argument occur in the passive.

Stelpunum var hjálpað
{The girls.DAT} was helped
The girls were helped.

Hennar var saknað
She.GEN was missed
She was missed.

== See also ==
- Dative construction
- Ergative–absolutive language
