= Formative case =

Grammatical case in Hungarian

In the Hungarian language the essive-formal case or formative case can be viewed as combining an essive case and a formal case, and it can express the position, task, state (e.g. "as a tourist"), or the manner (e.g. "like a hunted animal").

== Grammatical status: case vs. adverb-forming suffix ==
Some earlier analyses of the Hungarian case system, such as László Antal's A magyar esetrendszer (1961) did not consider the essive-formal to be a case, and disputed the status of the suffix -ként in the declension system. One reason for this was that while Hungarian case suffixes are absolute word-final, -ként permits further suffixation by the locative suffix -i. However, this is not unique to the essive-formal; -i can follow other case suffixes, for example -ban/-ben in nagybani, though it has become less common since the early 20th century (e.g. ágy(tól) és asztaltóli elválasztás). Another reason was that most Hungarian case endings participate in vowel harmony, while -ként does not, possibly due to its later development.

However, the essive-formal case complies with the criterion for Hungarian cases set by modern descriptive grammars, namely that it can appear as the argument of a verb, specified in its form, such as in kezel (vmi)ként (’treat, handle as ...’), viselkedik (vmi)ként (’behave as ...’), végez (vmi)ként (’graduate as ...’), elhelyezkedik (vmi)ként (’find employment as ...’) etc. Therefore, it is today considered as one of the 18 established and acknowledged cases in Hungarian, rather than being one of the adverb-forming suffixes, which do not comply with the criterion.
