= Comparative case =

Grammatical case

The comparative case (abbreviated comp) is a grammatical case which marks a nominal to indicate comparison with another entity through the designation of a case marker. It is not to be confused with the semblative case, a discrete grammatical case which expresses the similarity of one entity to another. The comparative case is distinct from comparative degree in that the comparative case involves morphemes appearing on nouns, while in comparative degree morphemes appear on adjectives or adverbs.

== Examples ==
=== Uralic languages ===
An example of a comparative case which designates similarity to something is found in Mari, where the comparative case is the suffix -la (-ла) as in (1):

колла
kol-la
fish-COMP
'like fish'

Mari also uses the comparative case when denoting the language a person is speaking, writing, or hearing. Then, however, the accentuation varies slightly from the standard case. Usually, the suffix is not stressed. When it is used to denote a language, however, it is stressed.

In another Uralic language, Erzya-Mordvin, the comparative case suffix is -ška. The case is generally used to indicate similarity in size or quantity.

кудошка
kudo-ška
house-COMP.INDEF
'as big as a house'

ветешка
veťe-ška
five-COMP.INDEF
'about five'

=== Caucasian languages ===
An example of the comparative case marking the noun serving as the standard of comparison comes from the Chechen suffix -l. For example, the comparative suffix appears on sha 'ice' in shal shiila 'cold as ice':

sha-l shiila
ice-COMP cold
'as cold as ice'

The comparative case can also be found in Archi, a Northeast Caucasian language:

ʁuli-xur bošo
dog-COMP big
'Bigger than the dog.'

=== Turkic languages ===
Similarly, in the Turkic language Sakha (Yakut), the noun serving as the standard of comparison can be marked with the comparative case suffix -TĀGAr .

бу ыт аттааҕар түргэнник сүүрэр
Bu ït at-taaɣar türgennik süür-er
DEM dog horse-COMP quickly run-PRES
'This dog runs faster than a horse'

This latter sense of comparative case is similar to locational comparatives, where a locational case such as the ablative marks the noun in a standard of comparison, found in Turkic languages such as Uzbek:

ɔt-am u ɔdam-dan yɔš
father-POSS.1SG that man-ABL young
'My father is younger than that man'

=== Language isolates ===
Nivkh is another language with this comparative case suffix (-yk/-ak):

Tlaņi ķanņ-ak eɣ-d
reindeer dog-COMP be.fast-PRES
'A reindeer is faster than a dog'

== See also ==
- Semblative case
- Formal case
- Equative case

== Bibliography ==
- Krueger, John R. (1962). Yakut Manual. Bloomington: Indiana U Press.
- Gruzdeva, Ekaterina (1998). Nivkh. München: Lincom Europa.
- Stassen, Leon (2013). "Comparative Constructions". In Dryer, Matthew; Haspelmath, Martin (eds.). The World Atlas of Language Structures Online. Leipzig: Max Planck Institute for Evolutionary Anthropology. Archived from the original on April 1, 2022.
- Зорина, З. Г., Г. С. Крылова, and Э. С. Якимова. Марийский язык для всех, ч. 1. Йошкар-Ола: Марийское книжное издательство, 1990;
