= Essive-modal case =

Grammatical case in Hungarian

The essive-modal case is a case in the Hungarian language that expresses either the state, capacity, task in which somebody is or which somebody has (essive case, e.g. "as a reward", "for example"), or the manner in which an action is carried out, an event happens, or the language which somebody knows (modal case, e.g. "sloppily", "unexpectedly", "speak German"). It is sometimes called the essive case.

An example of this would be in the sentence "Beszélek magyarul." (I speak Hungarian.) The sentence denotes the ability of being able to speak the Hungarian language. According to vowel harmony rules, ul becomes ül in cases such as "Beszélek németül." (I speak German.) because the word for "German", német is composed completely of median and/or frontal vowels.
