= Essive case =

Grammatical case

In grammar, the essive, or similaris, case (abbreviated ess) marks nouns as definite periods of time during which something happens or an ongoing action is completed. It can also denote a temporary location, state of being, or character in which the subject was at a given time; in this last sense, the essive is often described as being equivalent to the English prepositional phrase "as a(n) ____".

== Finnish ==
In Finnish, it is marked by adding "-na/-nä" (depending on the vowel harmony) to the stem of the noun.

Examples:
lapsi "child" → lapsena "as a child", "when (I) was a child".
Veljeni on säveltäjänä "My brother is a composer (at somewhere or a certain kind of)."
cf: Veljeni on säveltäjä (Nom) (My brother is a composer) vs. Veljeni on säveltäjänä (Ess) (My brother works/acts as a composer (somewhere))
säveltäjä "composer" → säveltäjänä "state of being a composer (the given time is the present)"
Example: 'Veljeni on säveltäjänä orkesterissa "My brother is a composer in an orchestra".
Example: 'Veljeni on säveltäjänä ainutlaatuinen "As a composer my brother is unique".

In Finnish, the essive case is technically categorized as an old locative case, a case that, in some way, indicates spatial location. However, in the present language, the case has lost the majority of its spatial meaning. The case instead typically denotes a state that is temporary or inclined to change.

Some fixed expressions retain the essive in its ancient locative meaning, however: "at home" is kotona.

Example: Luen lehtiä kotona. "I read newspapers at home."

If the inessive were used, kodissani, it would distinguish the activity from reading the papers, such as in the garage or in the garden (of the home).

- Minulla on kylpyhuone kodissani. "I have a bathroom in my home" (not in the garage or garden).

The essive case is also used in a temporal sense with certain nouns, notably the names of weekdays, and vuosi (year), aamu (morning), ilta (evening), and yö (night), as well as dates.

viime maanantaina "(on) last Monday."
kuudentena joulukuuta "on 6 December".
tänä päivänä "on this day"
viime vuonna "(during) last year"

When marking something that cannot literally change states, the essive case can implicate the presence of alternative states, even two individual, differing "worlds". That can be seen in the following example:

Example: Ostin helmen aitona. "I bought the pearl thinking it was genuine [but later found out that it was not]."

The example above illustrates the process by which marking of the essive case can be seen as creating two differing "worlds": one real and one illusionary. The "temporary" component of the meaning encoded by marking of the essive case on the Finnish word for "genuine" (aito) makes a distinction between the perceived state of the subject, as genuine at the time of purchase, and the actual state of subject, as not genuine as it is now perceived or at the time of the moment of speech.

== Estonian ==
In Estonian, it is marked by adding "-na" to the genitive stem. Marking of the case in Estonian denotes the capacity in which the subject acts. The essive case is used for indicating "states of being" but not of "becoming", which is instead marked by the translative case, the elative case, or the nominative case.

Examples:

laps → lapse → lapsena
"child" {} {"of child"} {} {"as a child", "when (I) was a child"}

Ta töötab insenerina "He works as an engineer."

== See also ==
- Essive-formal case
- Essive-modal case
