= Postessive case =

Grammatical case

In linguistics, the postessive case (abbreviated poste) is a noun case that indicates movement behind something.

This case is found in Northeast Caucasian languages like Lezgian and Agul. In Lezgian the suffix -хъ (-qh), when added to the ergative-case noun, marks the postessive case. This case is now rarely used for its original meaning "behind" and is often used to mean "with" or "in exchange for".
