= Sublative case =

Grammatical case

In grammar, the term sublative case (abbreviated SUBL) is used to refer to grammatical cases expressing different situations: In Hungarian and Finnish (rarely used), it expresses the destination of the movement, originally to the surface of something (e.g. sit down on the ground, climb the tree), but in other figurative meanings as well (e.g. to university, for two nights), or into a language, while in Tsez and other Northeast Caucasian languages it denotes a movement towards the bottomsides or the area under an object. The sublative case is used in the Finnish, Tsez and Hungarian languages.

== Hungarian ==
In Hungarian the suffix "-re" or "-ra" denotes the sublative. It can be used like "onto" but also in more abstract cases for flat areas (cities, airports). For example:

- hajóra (onto the boat)
- Budapestre megyek (I am going to Budapest)
- repülőtérre (to the airport)

== Finnish ==
Examples in Finnish:

- minne - where to?
- jonne - where (relative pronoun)
- moniaalle - to many places
- kaikkialle - to everywhere
