= Postelative case =

Grammatical case

In linguistics, the postelative case (abbreviated POSTEL) is a noun case that indicates location from behind.

This case is found in the Northeast Caucasian language Lezgian.
