= Superessive case =

Grammatical case

In grammar, the superessive case (abbreviated supe) is a grammatical case indicating location on top of, or on the surface of something. Its name comes from Latin supersum, superesse: to be over and above. While most languages communicate this concept through the use of adpositions, there are some, such as Hungarian, which make use of cases for this grammatical structure.

An example in Hungarian: a könyveken means "on the books", literally "the books-on".

In Finnish, superessive is a case in the adverbial cases category, that are productive only with a limited set of stems. The superessive is marked with the -alla/-ällä ending. For example:

- kaikkialla means "everywhere" (lit. "everything-at")
- täällä means "(at) here" (from tämä - "this", lit. "at this place")
- muualla means "(at) somewhere else" (from muu - "other", lit. "other-at")

In Lezgian, the superessive case is marked with suffixes: sew-re-l 'on the bear'.

== See also ==
- Subessive case, the equivalent case used to denote location under or below
