= Delative case =

Grammatical case in Hungarian

In grammar, the delative case (abbreviated DEL; from Latin: deferre "to bear or bring away or down") is a grammatical case in the Hungarian language which originally expressed the movement from the surface of something (e.g. "off the table"), but has also taken on several other meanings (e.g. "about people"), some of which are related to the original (e.g. "from the post office").

In addition to obvious movement off a surface (such as a table), Hungarian uses the delative case to express the origin of movement from some cities and places; when one is expressing that something comes from (or is coming from) a place, the name of the place is put into the delative case. Generally, Hungary itself and most Hungarian cities are placed into the delative case (foreign cities and some Hungarian cities use the elative case in this context).

I came from Budapest (Budapestről jöttem).
The train from Hungary (Magyarország) is coming (Jön a vonat Magyarországról).

With the same meaning as in Hungarian (where something comes from, origin of movement), the delative is also used for some words as an adverbial case in Finnish, e.g.:

- täältä - from here
- tuolta - from over there
- sieltä - from there
- muualta - from elsewhere
- toisaalta - from elsewhere, on the other hand
- yhtäältä - from one place
