= Subessive case =

Grammatical case

The subessive case (abbreviated sube) is a grammatical case indicating location under or below something. It occurs in Northeast Caucasian languages like Tsez and Bezhta as well as in Old Nubian.

== See also ==
- Superessive case, the equivalent case used to denote location on or above
