= Pertingent case =

Grammatical case

The pertingent case is a grammatical case found in the Tlingit language. It is used to refer to something which is touching something else: for example, in English, "the chair touching the table", or "against the wall".

In the Tlingit language, the pertingent case is marked with the suffix -x̱. For instance, ÿax̱- is the pertingent form of ÿán, meaning “shore”. In Tlingit, the case may also be used to refer to the membership of a group. The phrase Kaagwaantaan-x̱ means “they are of the Kaagwaantaan clan”. This usage of the case can be found in sentences containing stative imperfectives that refer to multiple positions. For example, the phrase áx̱ naadákwt means “bodies of water lie here and there upon it.”

It is also found in the Archi language.
