= Orientative case =

Grammatical case

The orientative case (abbreviated ORIENT) is a grammatical case which marks a noun phrase whose referent is used as a point of reference. It can be used to mark a spatial reference point such as a landmark, or an abstract one such as a social ideal. It can be found in the Chukchi language.
