= Perlative case =

Grammatical case

In grammar, the perlative case (abbreviated PER), also known as pergressive, is a grammatical case which expresses that something moved "through", "across", or "along" the referent of the noun that is marked. The case is found in a number of Australian Aboriginal languages such as Kuku-Yalanji, Kaurna, Kamu and Ngan'gi, as well as in Aymara, Inuktitut, and the extinct Tocharian languages.

In some languages, like Warluwara, it marks the nouns that accompanies motion. For example, in a sentence meaning I'm going with this man, the noun man would be in perlative. Other languages, like Nunggubuyu, have the retrospective pergressive, which indicates the sense of back with or back among.

In Kamu, the case is marked with the -ba suffix.

== See also ==
- Prolative case
