= Antessive case =

Grammatical case

The antessive case (abbreviated ANTE) is used for marking the spatial relation of preceding or being before. The case is found in some Dravidian languages. For example, in Tamil, the antessive case has three primary meanings.

- In front of something or someone

Eṅkaḷ vīṭṭiṟku muṉṉāl oru kōyil irukkiṟatu
1PL.GEN home ANTE INDEF temple EXIST
There is a temple in front of our home

- To present someone or something in front of someone or something

Tir-uṭaṉ nītipati-kku muṉṉāl koṇṭu varappa-ṭṭ-aṉ
thief-SOC judge-DAT ANTE INS come-PST-3SG.MASC
The thief was brought before the judge

- Being 'at front' with reference to position

Avaṉ eḻutuvatil ellā:ru-kkum muṉṉa:L iruk-kiṟ-āṉ
3SG write-DEF-LOC everyone-DAT ANTE EXIST-PRES-3SG.MASC
He is in front of all in writing
