= Semblative case =

Grammatical case expressing resemblance

The semblative case (abbreviated sembl) or similative case (abbreviated simv) is a grammatical case that denotes the similarity of one entity to another. The semblative case is sometimes referred to as the similative case.

== In Wagiman ==
Wagiman, an indigenous Australian language, has a semblative case suffix -yiga, that is functionally identical to the -like suffix in English, as in the example:

gahan mamin dup-pa ga-yu jilimakkun-yiga
that {white man} sit-ASP 3SG-be woman-SEMBL
That white man sits like a woman

== In Warlpiri ==
In Warlpiri, the semblative case can be a semantic case, i.e., it can be semantically richer and less dependent on the verb. In the example below, the -piya ('like') suffix can act as the main predicate and can attach to a demonstrative, suggesting that it is not purely a derivational affix.

Kardirri-nya ka nyina wirngarri-ji.
White-FOC PRES sit.NPST barn.owl-TOP
The barn owl is white.

Kakutu-ju nyanungu-piya-juku-jala, kala kardirri-lki ka nyina wirngarri-ji
Boobook.owl-TOP He-like-still-actually but White-now PRES sit.NPST barn.owl-TOP
As for the boobook owl, he is still actually like him, but the barn owl is now white.

'The barn owl is white. The Boobook owl is just like him except that the barn owl is white.'

== In English ==
Although the semblative case is not found in English, there are several semblative derivational suffixes, including -like, -ish and -esque.

Texas Man Catches Fish With Human-Like Teeth

As in many other languages, semblativity in English is marked with derivational affixes instead of being an inflectional case.

== See also ==
- Comparative case
- Formal case
- Equative case
