= Finnish grammar =

Grammatical rules of the Finnish language

The Finnish language is spoken by the majority of the population in Finland and by ethnic Finns elsewhere. Unlike the Indo-European languages spoken in neighbouring countries, such as Swedish and Norwegian, which are North Germanic languages, or Russian, which is a Slavic language, Finnish is a Uralic language of the Finnic languages group. Typologically, Finnish is agglutinative. As in some other Uralic languages, Finnish has vowel harmony, and like other Finnic languages, it has consonant gradation.

== Pronouns ==
The pronouns are inflected in the Finnish language much in the same way that their referent nouns are.

=== Personal pronouns ===
Personal pronouns are used to refer to human beings only. In Finnish all personal pronouns are gender-neutral and the English she and he can't be translated directly. Personal pronouns in Standard Finnish in the nominative case are listed in the following table:

Personal pronouns
Finnish	English
Singular
minä	I
sinä	you (thou)
hän	he/she/they
Plural
me	we
te	you (y'all)
he	they
Polite
Te	you

Because Finnish verbs are inflected for person and number, in Finnish standard language subject pronouns are not required, and the first and second-person pronouns are usually omitted except when used for emphasis. In the third person, however, the pronoun is required: hän menee '(s)he goes'/'they go (singular they)'. In spoken Finnish, all pronouns are generally used, even without emphatic meaning.

In colloquial and dialectal Finnish, the pronouns se and ne, which in standard Finnish are used for inanimate things and animals, are the usual third-person pronouns instead of hän and he, respectively. Use of hän and he is mostly restricted to writing and formal or markedly polite speech. In dialectal Finnish, hän and he have special uses, such as to indicate that another person is being paraphrased. Animals are in standard Finnish never referred to as hän or he. Minä and sinä are usually replaced with colloquial forms. The most common variants are mä and sä, though, in some dialects mää and sää, mnää and snää or mie and sie are used. On the other hand, me, te and he lack reduced colloquial forms, so variants such as myö, työ, and hyö of some eastern varieties are dialectal. Some common verbs, such as olla "to be" and tulla "to come", exhibit similarly reduced colloquial forms:

Personal pronouns
Written/formal	Spoken/colloquial
Singular
(minä) olen/tulen	mä oon/tuun
(sinä) olet/tulet	sä oot/tuut
hän/se on/tulee	se on/tulee
Plural
(me) olemme/tulemme	me ollaan/tullaan
(te) olette/tulette	te ootte/tuutte
he/ne ovat/tulevat	ne on/tulee
Polite
Te olette/tulette	Te ootte/tuutte

The second-person plural can be used as a polite form when addressing one person, as in some Indo-European languages. However, this usage is diminishing in Finnish society.

=== Demonstrative pronouns ===
The demonstratives are used of non-human animate entities and inanimate objects. However, se and ne is often used to refer to humans in colloquial Finnish. (This usage is quite correct in a demonstrative sense, i.e. when qualified by the relative pronoun joka, and in fact, it is hypercorrect to replace a demonstrative se or ne with hän or he just because the antecedent is human.) Furthermore, the demonstratives are used to refer to group nouns and the number of the pronoun must correlate with the number of its referent.

Demonstrative pronouns
Finnish	English
Singular
tämä	this
tuo	that
se	it/that
Plural
nämä	these
nuo	those
ne	they/those

=== Interrogative pronouns ===
Interrogative pronouns
Finnish	English
kuka	who, which (of many)
ken	who, which (of many) — old or dialectal word
mikä	what, which (of many)
kumpi	which (of two)
kumpainen	which (of two) — old or dialectal word

Ken is now archaic, but its inflected forms are used instead of those of kuka: ketä instead of kuta ("whom"): Ketä rakastat? "Whom do you love?"

=== Relative pronouns ===
Relative pronouns
Pronoun	Example	English
joka (refers to preceding word)	hän on ainoa, jonka muistan	"they are (singular), s/he is the only one whom (I) remember"
mikä (refers to preceding clause/sentence or to a pronoun or a superlative that refers to a thing)	se on ainoa asia, minkä muistan	"it is the only thing that (I) remember"

=== Reciprocal pronouns ===
Reciprocal pronouns
Pronoun	Example	English
toinen	he rakastavat toisiaan	"they love each other" (plural)
toinen	he rakastavat toinen toistaan	"they love one another" (dual)

=== Reflexive pronouns ===
Reflexive pronouns
Pronoun	Suffix	Example	English
itse	plus corresponding possessive suffix	keitin itselleni teetä	"(I) made myself some tea"

=== Indefinite pronouns ===
A large group that entails all of the pronouns that do not fall into any of the categories above. Notice that there are no negative pronouns, such as "nobody"; rather, the positive pronoun is negated with the negative verb ei. No double negatives are possible.

Indefinite pronouns
Finnish	English
joka (uninflected)	every, each
jokainen	every, everyone
joku	some, someone (person)
jompikumpi	either one
jokin	some, something (animal, thing)
kukin	each one
kumpainenkin	both (old or dialectal)
kumpikin	both
mikin	each thing (dialectal)
kenkään	anyone (old or poetic)
kukaan (nom.), kene...kään (oblique)	anyone
→ ei kukaan	no one
kumpikaan	either one
→ ei kumpikaan	neither one
mikään	anything
→ ei mikään	nothing
mones (nom.), monente- (oblique)	the ordinal pronoun (representing first, second, etc.)

Each pronoun declines. However, the endings -kaan/-kään and -kin are clitics, and case endings are placed before them, e.g. mikään "any", miltäkään "from any". There are irregular nominatives. As indicated, kukaan is an irregular nominative; the regular root is kene- with -kään, e.g. kukaan "(not) anyone", keneltäkään "from (not) anyone".

English lacks a direct equivalent to the pronoun mones; it would be "that-th", or "which-th" for questions. For example, Palkkio riippuu siitä monentenako tulee maaliin "The reward depends on as-which-th one comes to the finish", or explicitly "The reward depends on in which position one comes to the finish". It would be difficult to translate the question Monesko?, but, although far from proper English, the question How manyeth may give an English-speaking person an idea of the meaning.

Some indefinite adjectives are often perceived as indefinite pronouns. These include:

Indefinite adjectives
Finnish	English
ainoa	the only one
eräs	some, certain, one
harva	few
itse (non-reflexive)	self
kaikki	all, everyone, everything
molemmat	both
moni	many
muu	other
muutama	some, a few
sama	same
toinen (non-reciprocal, non-numeral use)	another

== Nouns ==
Finnish does not have grammatical gender, not even in personal pronouns: hän is 'he', 'she' or 'they(sg.)' depending on the referent. There are no articles, neither definite nor indefinite.

=== Cases ===
Finnish has fifteen noun cases: four grammatical cases, six locative cases, two essive cases (three in some Eastern dialects), and three marginal cases.

Finnish cases
Case	Suffix	English prep.	Example	Translation
Grammatical
nominative (nominatiivi)	–	–	sinä, talo	you, house
genitive (genetiivi)	-n	of, 's	sinun, talon	your(s), house's
accusative (akkusatiivi)	–, -n, -t	–	sinut, talon, talo	you (thee), house (see discussion below)
partitive (partitiivi)	-(t)a / -(t)ä	–	sinua, taloa	you, house (as the object of an atelic verb)
Locative (internal)
inessive (inessiivi)	-ssa / -ssä	in	talossa	in a house
elative (elatiivi)	-sta / -stä	out of	talosta	out of a house
illative (illatiivi)	-Vn, -seen, -siin	into	taloon, Porvooseen	into a house, into Porvoo
Locative (external)
adessive (adessiivi)	-lla / -llä	at, on	talolla, katolla	at a house, on a roof
ablative (ablatiivi)	-lta / -ltä	from	talolta	from a house
allative (allatiivi)	-lle	onto, to	katolle, talolle, pojalle	onto a roof, to (the proximity of) a house, to a boy
Essive
essive (essiivi)	-na / -nä	as	talona	as a house
translative (translatiivi)	-ksi	into (the role of)	kouluksi	into (being) a school
Marginal
instructive (instruktiivi)	-n, -in	with (the aid of)	taloin	with the houses
abessive (abessiivi)	-tta / -ttä	without	talotta	without a house
comitative (komitatiivi)	-ne-	together (with)	taloineen	with their house(s)

Some notes about the cases listed in the table above:

- The locative cases are also used for grammatical function, such as benefactive, dative (often in the allative), and other functions.
- There is historically some difference of opinion as to the character and indeed existence (for most words) of the accusative case in modern Finnish. The recent, authoritative grammar Iso suomen kielioppi takes the position that only the personal pronouns and the personal interrogative pronoun kuka have a true accusative case which is distinguished by the suffix -t. For nouns, adjectives, numerals, and other pronouns, there is no accusative case; instead, these words take the nominative or genitive in object positions (where they do not take the partitive). This differs from the more traditional view, to which many learners' grammars still adhere, that there are accusative forms that appear identical to the nominative or genitive. This traditional view is based on known diachronic phonological changes in the language.
- Marginal cases are mostly used in writing, or in the case of the instructive, in fixed expressions such as Vedä pyyhe molemmin käsin ('Pull the paper towel using both hands')
  - A noun in the comitative case is always followed by a possessive suffix. However, as is typical in Finnish, an adjective does not take possessive suffixes: Mies ylellisine taloineen "A man with his luxurious house(s)", with comitative -ne on both the adjective and noun, but the third person possessive suffix -en on the noun only.
- Regarding the illative suffix -Vn: "V" stands in for a preceding (short) vowel: talo-Vn yields taloon, but kukka-Vn yields kukkaan.

==== Relationship between locative cases ====
As in many other Uralic languages, locative cases in Finnish can be classified according to three criteria: the spatial position (interior or surface), the motion status (stationary or moving), and within the latter, the direction of the movement (approaching or departing). The classification captures a morphophonological pattern that distinguishes interior and surface spatial position; long consonants (/sː/ in -ssa / -ssä and /lː/ in -lla / -llä) express stationary motion, whereas a /t/ expresses "movement from". The table below shows these relationships schematically:

Schematic summary of locative cases
Spatial position	Motion status		
Spatial position	Stationary	Moving	
Spatial position	Stationary	approaching	departing
Interior	inessive ('in') -ssa / -ssä	illative ('into') -Vn	elative ('out of') -sta / -stä
Surface	adessive ('on') -lla / -llä	allative ('onto') -lle	ablative ('off from') -lta / -ltä

=== Plurals ===
Finnish nominal plurals are often marked by -i- (though -t is a suppletive variant in the nominative and accusative, as is common in Uralic languages). Singular and plural numbers cross-cut the distinctions in grammatical cases, and several number/case combinations have somewhat idiosyncratic uses. Several of these deserve special mention.

==== Nominative/accusative plural ====
The nominative plural is used for definite count nouns that are subjects, while the plural object of a telic verb bears the accusative plural. The syncretic suffix that covers both uses is -t. This suffix can only appear in the word-final position; i.e. it is omitted when a possessive suffix is present.

Nominative plural
Finnish	English
Koirat olivat huoneessa	"The dogs were in the room"
Huoneet olivat suuria	"The rooms were large"
Minäkin näin koirat	"I too saw the dogs"

==== Numerals ====
When a noun is modified by a numeral not equal to one, and the numeral is in the nominative singular, the noun bears the partitive singular. Otherwise, the noun and the numeral agree with each other in number and case.

Following numerals
Finnish	English
huoneessa oli kaksi koiraa	"there were two dogs in the room"
talossa oli kolme huonetta	"the house had three rooms"
ostin tietokoneen tuhannella eurolla	"I bought a computer for a thousand euros"
tarvitsen kahdet kengät	"I need two pairs of shoes"

==== Inflected plural ====
This uses the stem of the partitive plural inflected with the same set of endings as for singular nouns. The suffix is -i-, and it suppresses long vowels; it may only appear before another suffix.

Inflected plural
Finnish	English
huone → huoneita	'(some) rooms'
→ huoneissa	'in rooms'

As a combined example of plurals

Inflected plural
Finnish	English
lintu on puussa	'the bird is in the tree'
→ linnut ovat puissa	'the birds are in the trees'

==== Inflection of pronouns ====
The personal pronouns are inflected in the same way as nouns, and can be found in most of the same cases as nouns. For example:

Inflection of pronouns
Finnish	Case	Example	English
minä	nominative		'I'
minun	genitive		('my, mine')
minun	genitive	tämä talo on minun	'this house is mine'
minun	genitive	tämä on minun taloni	'this is my house'
minut	accusative	hän tuntee minut	's/he knows me'
minua	partitive	hän rakastaa minua	's/he loves me'
minussa	inessive	tämä herättää minussa vihaa	'this provokes (lit. awakens) anger in me'
minusta	elative	hän puhui minusta	's/he was talking about/of me'. Also used idiomatically to mean 'in my opinion'.
minuun	illative	hän uskoi minuun	's/he believed in me'
minulla	adessive	minulla on rahaa	'I've got some money' (lit.'On me there's money')
minulta	ablative	hän otti minulta rahaa	's/he took some money from/off me'.
minulle	allative	anna minulle rahaa	'give me some money'
sinuna	essive	sinuna en tekisi sitä	'If I were you, I wouldn't do it' (lit. 'as you')
minuksi	translative	häntä luullaan usein minuksi	's/he is often mistaken for me'

=== Noun/adjective stem types ===
The stem of a word is the part to which inflectional endings are affixed. For most noun and adjective types, the nominative case is identical to the basic stem (the nominative is unmarked).

==== Vowel stems ====
A word with a vowel stem is one that ends in a vowel in the nominative, and retains a final vowel in all forms. The stem vowel can however change in certain inflected forms:

English	stem vowel	singular	sg. gen.	sg. part.	plural	pl. gen.	pl. part.	Notes
fish	-a	kala	kalan	kalaa	kalat	kalojen	kaloja	a + i becomes oj when after a, e or i.
corner	-a	kulma	kulman	kulmaa	kulmat	kulmien	kulmia	a + i becomes i when after o or u.
summer	-ä	kesä	kesän	kesää	kesät	kesien	kesiä	ä + i becomes i.
name	-e	nimi	nimen	nimeä	nimet	nimien	nimiä	e becomes i at the end of a word; e + i becomes i.
hall	-i	halli	hallin	hallia	hallit	hallien	halleja	i + i becomes ej.
light	-o	valo	valon	valoa	valot	valojen	valoja	A stem with a labial vowel -o, -u, -y, -ö is invariable; plural i becomes j between vowels.
teddy bear	-e	nalle	nallen	nallea	nallet	nallejen	nalleja	Invariable e-stems can be found in very recent coinages.
land, earth	-aa	maa	maan	maata	maat	maiden	maita	A long vowel is shortened before the oblique plural -i-.
road	-ie	tie	tien	tietä	tiet	teiden	teitä	Historical long mid vowels *ee *öö *oo have been diphthongized, but the original vowel survives in shortened forms.

The change of original (pre-Proto-Finnic) final *e to i means that the stem vowel of a word ending in i cannot be determined from the nominative alone; one of the inflected forms must be consulted. However, most old inherited words ending in i decline as e-stems (or consonants stems, see below), while modern loans, where i frequently is added for phonotactic reasons (as in the case of halli), always decline as i-stems.

==== Consonant stems ====
A word with a consonant stem is one where case suffixes can in some cases be affixed directly after the last consonant for at least some forms. Words with consonant stems come in three broad classes.

The first class of consonant-stem words largely resemble e-stems, but allow elision of the stem vowel in the partitive singular, and for certain words, plural genitive. In the later case, this involves a special allomorph -ten, employing the plural marker t rather than i/j.

The final consonant in words of this class must be one of h, l, m, n, r, s, t. Other remarks for e-stem words still apply.

English	stem	singular	sg. gen.	sg. part.	plural	pl. gen.	pl. part.	Notes
goat	-h(e)	vuohi	vuohen	vuohta	vuohet	vuohien	vuohia	
wind	-l(e)	tuuli	tuulen	tuulta	tuulet	tuulien, tuulten	tuulia	
broth	-m(e)	liemi	liemen	lientä	liemet	liemien, lienten	liemiä	m → n before t.
sound	-n(e)	ääni	äänen	ääntä	äänet	äänien, äänten	ääniä	
bow	-s(e)	jousi	jousen	jousta	jouset	jousien, jousten	jousia	

Words of this type may have somewhat irregular declension due to additional historical changes:

English	stem	singular	sg. gen.	sg. part.	plural	pl. gen.	pl. part.	Notes
child	-ps(e)	lapsi	lapsen	lasta	lapset	lapsien, lasten	lapsia	The first consonant in a cluster of three is lost: Cs + t → st.
knife	-ts(e)	veitsi	veitsen	veistä	veitset	veitsien	veitsiä	The first consonant in a cluster of three is lost: Cs + t → st.
hand	-t(e)	käsi	käden	kättä	kädet	käsien, kätten	käsiä	ti becomes si. (Variation of t/d, nt/nn is regular and due to consonant gradation.)
nail	-nt(e)	kynsi	kynnen	kynttä	kynnet	kynsien	kynsiä	ti becomes si. (Variation of t/d, nt/nn is regular and due to consonant gradation.)
two	-kt(e)	kaksi	kahden	kahta	kahdet	kaksien	kaksia	In addition to the previous changes, kt and ktt become ht/hd.

For some words of this type, modern Finnish displays a tendency of development from consonant-stems to e-stems. For example, the partitive singular of the word tuomi "bird cherry" may be tuonta (consonant stem) or tuomea (vowel stem).

Another class of consonant-stem words end in a consonant even in the nominative; if a stem vowel is required for phonotactic reasons, e again appears. In Modern Finnish, only dental and alveolar consonants /l n r s t/) occur word-finally but previously words ending in /ʃ~ʂ h k m/ were possible as well.

English	stem	singular	sg. gen.	sg. part.	plural	pl. gen.	pl. part.	Notes
joint	-l(e)	nivel	nivelen	niveltä	nivelet	nivelien, nivelten	niveliä	
core	-m(e)	ydin	ytimen	ydintä	ytimet	ytimien, ydinten	ytimiä	m → n when word-final or before t.
perch	-n(e)	ahven	ahvenen	ahventa	ahvenet	ahvenien, ahventen	ahvenia	
sister	-r(e)	sisar	sisaren	sisarta	sisaret	sisarien, sisarten	sisaria	
beer	-t(e)	olut	oluen	olutta	oluet	oluiden	oluita	t disappears in vowel-stem forms due to consonant gradation.

===== Nouns ending in -s =====
Vocalization or lenition is found in addition to any possible consonant gradation, e.g. kuningas (nominative) ~ kuninkaan (genitive), or mies ~ miehen. The illatives are marked thus: kuninkaaseen, mieheen.

===== -nen nouns =====
This is a very large class of words which includes common nouns (for example nainen 'woman'), many proper names, and many common adjectives. Adding -inen to a noun is a very productive mechanism for creating adjectives (lika 'dirt, filth' → likainen 'dirty'; ilo 'joy' → iloinen 'merry, happy'; muovi 'plastic' → muovinen 'made of plastic'/'plastic-like' ). It can also function as a diminutive ending.

The form behaves as if it ended in -s, with the exception of the nominative, where it is -nen. Thus, the stem for these words removes the -nen and adds -s(e) after which the inflectional ending is added:

Finnish	English
muovisessa pussissa	'in the plastic bag'
kaksi muovista lelua	'two plastic toys'
muoviseen laatikkoon	'into the plastic box'

Here are some of the diminutive forms that are in use:

Finnish	Stemming from	English
kätönen	käsi	'a small hand' (affectionate)
lintunen	lintu	'birdie', 'a small bird'
veikkonen	veikko	'lad'
kirjanen	kirja	'booklet'
kukkanen	kukka	'a little flower'
lapsonen	lapsi	'a little child'

A special class of Finnish nouns in -nen are surnames. Some of these are very old and often their original meaning is not readily apparent to a modern speaker. Many were later coined on the -nen pattern and these often have the suffix added to a word meaning a natural feature. Some representative examples are:

Finnish	From word	English
Rautiainen	rautio	blacksmith (of a blacksmith's family)
Korhonen	korho	'deaf' (of a deaf man's family)
Leinonen	leino	'sorrowful, melancholic'; alternatively male name Leino as short for Leonard
Virtanen, Jokinen, Järvinen, Nieminen...	virta, joki, järvi, niemi	'the family from by the stream (virta), river (joki), lake (järvi), peninsula (niemi)'
Mikkonen		[A family name assimilated from the name of the farmhouse, after the householder's name 'Mikko']
Martikainen		possible origin Martikka, a South Karelian surname
Lyytikäinen		from Lyytikkä, originating to Germanic male name Lydecke

The suffix -nen also occurs in place-names. Many place-names ending with -nen assume a plural form when inflected. For instance, the illative of Sörnäinen is Sörnäisiin instead of singular Sörnäiseen.

===== -e nouns =====
Most present-day -e nouns derive from older *-eh (<*-eš) or *-ek stems in which the consonant has been lost, which also explains why words in this class behave differently from the -i/-e class, which underwent word-final vowel raising in the nominative singular, such as *saare > saari ('island') but saaren, saarella, etc. ('island's', 'on the island'). Class -e word-final consonant does not survive in any form of the paradigm, although the existence of a consonant is still seen in that the nominative singular form (citation form) shows weak gradation, and strong grade vowel stem to which most case suffixes are applied.

E-stem words have an additional e in the inflected stem: perhe 'family' (< *pereh via metathesis), but perhee-, so perheessä, perheellä, etc.; which represents the historical loss of a medial consonant.

	perhe			liike		
Singular	Phase 1 *pereš(e-)	Phase 2 *pereh(e-)	Now	Phase 1 *liik'ek : *liikkege-	Phase 2 *liikeh : *liikkehe-	Now
nominative	*pereš	*pereh	perhe	*liik'ek	*liikeh	liike
genitive	*pereše-n	*perehe-n	perheen	*liikkeg-en	*liikkehe-n	liikkeen
illative	*pereše-sen	*perehe-se(he)n	perheeseen	*liikkege-sen	*liikkehe-se(he)n	liikkeeseen

However, in some dialects, the much older *-š and *-k stems have shifted to -s and -t instead, for instance in Pohjanmaa dialect *weneš > venes for standard vene ('boat') and *kastëk > kastet for standard kaste ('dew').

The partitive stem behaves yet differently due to a loss of word-medial -e- in some contexts before the change from *-k- to *-h- took place, in which the consonant has been assimilated to a -t- before it occurred in the context for being lost. Other case endings are suffixed to the strong grade/vowel stem.

-e nouns
case	huone 'room'	laite 'device'
partitive sg.	kaksi huonetta 'two rooms'	kaksi laitetta 'two devices'

More of this phenomenon is discussed in Finnish Phonology: Sandhi.

== Adjectives ==
Adjectives in Finnish are inflected in exactly the same way as nouns, and an adjective must agree in number and case with the noun it is modifying.

For example, here are some adjectives:

Finnish	English
iso	'big'
pieni	'small'
punainen	'red'

And here are some examples of adjectives inflected to agree with nouns:

Finnish	English
ison talon edessä	'in front of the big house'
kaksi pientä taloa	'two small houses'
punaisessa talossa	'in the red house'

Notice that the adjectives undergo the same sorts of stem changes when they are inflected as nouns do.

=== Comparative formation ===
The comparative of the adjective is formed by adding -mpi to the inflecting stem. For example:

Finnish	English	Finnish	English
iso	'big'	isompi	'bigger'
pieni	'small'	pienempi	'smaller'
punainen	'red'	punaisempi	'redder'

Since the comparative adjective is still an adjective, it must be inflected to agree with the noun it modifies. To make the inflecting stem of the comparative, the -mpi ending loses its final i. If the syllable context calls for a weak consonant, the -mp- becomes -mm-. Then -a- is added before the actual case ending (or -i- in plural). This should become clear with a few examples:

Finnish	English
isomman talon edessä	'in front of the bigger house'
kaksi pienempää taloa	'two smaller houses'
punaisemmassa talossa	'in the redder house'
punaisemmissa taloissa	'in the redder houses'

=== Superlative formation ===
The superlative of the adjective is formed by adding -in to the inflecting stem. For example:

Superlative formation
Finnish	English	Finnish	English
iso	'big'	isoin	'biggest'
punainen	'red'	punaisin	'reddest'

Note that because the superlative marker vowel is i, the same kind of changes can occur with vowel stems as happen in verb imperfects, and noun inflecting plurals:

Finnish	English	Finnish	English
pieni	'small'	pienin (not *pienein)	'smallest'

Since the superlative adjective is still an adjective, it must be inflected to agree with the noun it modifies. The -in becomes either -imma- or -impa- (plural -immi- or -impi-) depending on whether the syllable context calls for a weak or strong consonant. Here are the examples:

Finnish	English
isoimman talon edessä	'in front of the biggest house'
kaksi pienintä taloa	'the two smallest houses'
punaisimmassa talossa	'in the reddest house'
punaisimmissa taloissa	'in the reddest houses'

==== Irregular forms ====
The most important irregular form is:

Main irregular form
Finnish	English
hyvä, parempi, paras	'good, better, best'

The form paree "good" is not found in standard Finnish, but can be found in the Southern Ostrobothnian dialect.

Notice also:

More irregular forms
Finnish	Hypothetic regular	English
pitkä, pidempi ~ pitempi, pisin	pitkä, *pitkempi, *pitkin	'long, longer, longest'
lyhyt, lyhyempi ~ lyhempi, lyhin	lyhyt, lyhyempi, lyhyin	'short, shorter, shortest' (although the standard forms are also used)

There are a small number of other irregular comparative and superlative forms, such as:

Finnish	English
uusi, uudempi, uusin	'new, newer, newest'

Where the inflecting stem is uude- but the superlative is uusin = 'newest'.

== Adpositions ==
Postpositions are more common in Finnish than prepositions. Both postpositions and prepositions can be combined with either a noun or a possessive suffix to form a postpositional phrase.

=== Postpositions ===
Postpositions indicate place, time, cause, consequence or relation. In postpositional phrases the noun is usually in genitive:

Postpositions
Finnish	English
pöydän alla	'under the table'
joulun jälkeen	'after Christmas'
lasten tähden	'for the sake of the children'
jonkun puolesta	'on behalf of somebody'

The noun (or pronoun) can be omitted when there is a possessive suffix:

Finnish	English
olen _ vierellä|si	'(I) am next to (you)' or '(I) am by (your) side'

As with verbs, the pronoun cannot be omitted in the third person (singular or plural):

Olin _ mukanasi "I was with you"
but Olin hänen mukanaan "I was with him/her"

Tulen _ mukaanne "I will come with you (plural or polite)"
but Tulen heidän mukanaan "I will come with them"

=== Prepositions ===
There are few important prepositions in Finnish. In prepositional phrases the noun is always in the partitive:

Prepositions
Finnish	English
ennen joulua	before Christmas
ilman sinua	without you

Some postpositions can also be used as prepositions:

Postpositions as prepositions
Postposition	Preposition	English
kylän keskellä	keskellä kylää	in the middle of the village

Using postpositions as prepositions is not strictly incorrect and occurs in poetry, as in, for example, the song "Alla vaahterapuun" "under a maple tree", instead the usual vaahterapuun alla.

== Verbs ==
Finnish verbs are usually divided into seven groups depending on the stem type. All seven types have the same set of endings, but the stems undergo (slightly) different changes when inflected.

There are very few irregular verbs in Finnish. In fact, only olla = 'to be' has two irregular forms on "is" and ovat "are (pl.)"; other forms follow from the stem ole–/ol–; e.g. olet ← ole+t "you are", olkoon ← ol+koon "let it be". A handful of verbs, including nähdä "to see", tehdä "to do/make", and juosta "to run" have rare consonant mutation patterns which are not derivable from the infinitive. In spoken Finnish, some frequently used verbs (mennä, tulla, olla, panna) have irregular stems (mee, tuu, oo, paa, instead of mene, tule, ole, pane ("go, come, be, put"), respectively).

Finnish does not have a separate verb for possession (compare English "to have"). Possession is indicated in other ways, mainly by genitives and existential clauses. For animate possessors, the adessive case is used with olla, for example koiralla on häntä = 'the dog has a tail' – literally 'on the dog is a tail', or in English grammar, "There is a tail on the dog". This is similar to Irish and Welsh forms such as "There is a hunger on me".

=== Tense-aspect forms ===
Finnish verbs have present, imperfect, perfect and pluperfect tense-aspect forms.

- Present (nonpast): corresponds to English present and future tense forms. For the latter, a time qualifier may need to be used to avoid ambiguity. The present is formed with using the personal suffixes only. For example, otan "I take" (from ottaa, "to take").
- Imperfect: actually a preterite, but called "imperfect" for historical reasons; corresponds to English past continuous and past simple, indicating a past action which is complete but might have been a point event, a temporally extended event, or a repeated event. The imperfect is formed with the suffix -i- in addition to the personal suffixes, e.g. otin "I took".
- Perfect: corresponds to the English present perfect ("I have eaten") in most of its usages, but can carry more sense than in English of a past action with present effects. The form uses the verb olla "to be" in the present tense as an auxiliary verb. Personal suffixes are added to the auxiliary, while the main verb is in the -nut/-nyt participle form. For example, olen ottanut "I have taken", where ole- is the auxiliary verb stem, -n is the personal suffix for "I", otta- is the stem for the main verb, and -nut is the participle marker.
- Pluperfect: corresponds to the English past perfect ("I had visited") in its usage. Similarly to perfect, the verb olla is used in the past tense as an auxiliary verb. For example, olin ottanut "I had taken".

As stated above, Finnish has no grammatical future tense. To indicate futurity, a Finnish speaker may use forms that are, by some, deprecated as ungrammatical. One is the use of the verb tulla, 'to come', as it were as an auxiliary: Tämä tulee olemaan ongelma 'This is going to be a problem', cf Swedish Det här kommer att vara ett problem. Another, less common and now archaic, is to use the verb olla, 'to be', with the present passive participle of the main verb: Hän on oleva suuri Jumalan mies 'For he shall be great in the sight of the Lord' (Luke 1:15).

=== Voices ===
Finnish has two possible verb voices: active and passive. The active voice corresponds with the active voice of English, but the Finnish passive voice has some important differences from the English passive voice.

==== Passive voice ====
The so-called Finnish passive is impersonal and unipersonal, that is, it only appears in one form regardless of who is implicitly understood to be the performer of the action. In that respect, it could be described as a "fourth person" since there is no way of connecting the action performed with a particular agent (except for some nonstandard forms; see below). It is called "passive" for historical reasons in imitation of Swedish and Latin grammars, but this term is in fact incorrect because the object of an active sentence remains an object in the equivalent Finnish "passive" sentence, in other words, the Finnish "passive" sentence is in fact active. In languages with true passives, an active sentence's object becomes the subject in the equivalent passive sentence. Active: me pidätämme hänet "we will arrest him" => passive: pidätetään hänet "he will be arrested".

Consider the example: talo maalataan "the house will be painted". The time when the house is being painted could be added: talo maalataan marraskuussa "the house will be painted in November". The colour and method could be added: talo maalataan punaiseksi harjalla "the house will be painted red with a brush". But nothing can be said about the person who will do the painting; there is no simple way to say "the house will be painted by Jim". There is a calque, evidently from Swedish, toimesta "by the action of", that can be used to introduce the agent: Talo maalataan Jimin toimesta, approximately "The house will be painted by the action of Jim". This type of expression is considered prescriptively incorrect, but it may be found wherever direct translations from Swedish, English, etc. are made, especially in legal texts, and has traditionally been a typical feature of Finnish "officialese". An alternative form, passive + ablative, also a calque from Swedish, was once common but is now archaic.

Notice also that the object is in the form of the accusative that has the same form as the nominative case (which is true of all words except for the personal pronouns). Verbs which govern the partitive case continue to do so in the passive, and where the object of the action is a personal pronoun in the accusative, that goes into its special accusative form: minut/sinut/hänet/meidät/teidät/heidät unohdettiin "I/you/(s)he/we/you/they was/were forgotten". Whether the object of a passive verb should be termed the subject of the clause has been debated, but traditionally Finnish grammars have considered a passive clause to have no subject.

Use of the passive voice is not as common in Finnish as in Germanic languages; sentences in the active voice are preferred, if possible. Confusion may result, as the agent is lost and becomes ambiguous. For instance, a bad translation of the English "the PIN code is asked for by the device when..." into PIN-koodia kysytään, kun... raises the question "who asks?", whereas laite kysyy PIN-koodia, kun... ("the device asks for the PIN code when...") is unambiguous. Nevertheless, this usage of the passive is common in Finnish, particularly in literary and official contexts. Occasionally this leads to extreme cases such as kaupunginhallitus halutaan erottaa "it is wanted that the municipal board be dismissed", implying that a popular uprising could be near, when this suggestion could also be made by a political group in the town council consisting of only a few or theoretically (very unlikely because misleading) even a single person.

It can also be said that in the Finnish passive the agent is always human and never mentioned. A sentence such as 'the tree was blown down' would translate poorly into Finnish if the passive were used, since it would suggest the image of a group of people trying to blow the tree down.

Colloquially, the first-person plural indicative and imperative are replaced by the passive, e.g. menemme meille ("we'll go to our place") and menkäämme meille ("let us go to our place") are replaced by mennään meille (see spoken Finnish).

Because of its vagueness about who is performing the action, the passive can also translate the English "one does (something)", "(something) is generally done", as in sanotaan että... "they say that..."

Formation of the passive is dealt with in the article on Finnish verb conjugation.

===== As first-person plural =====
In modern colloquial Finnish, the passive form of the verb is used instead of the active first-person plural in the indicative and the imperative, to the almost complete exclusion of the standard verb forms. For example, in the indicative, the standard form is me menemme 'we are going', but the colloquial form is me mennään. Without the personal pronoun me, the passive alone replaces the first-person plural imperative, as in Mennään! 'Let's go!'. In colloquial speech, the pronoun me cannot be omitted without confusion, unlike when using the standard forms menemme (indicative) and menkäämme (imperative).

==== Zero person ====
The so-called "zero person" is a construct in which a verb appears in the third-person singular with no subject, and the identity of the subject must be understood from the context. Typically the implied subject is either the speaker or their interlocutor, or the statement is intended in a general sense. The zero person has some similarity to the English use of the formal subject one.

- Saunassa hikoilee "In the sauna, one sweats"
- Jos tulee ajoissa, saa paremman paikan "If you arrive in good time, you get a better seat"

=== Moods ===
==== Indicative ====
The indicative is the form of the verb used for making statements or asking simple questions. In the verb morphology sections, the mood referred to will be the indicative unless otherwise stated.

==== Conditional ====
The conditional mood expresses the idea that the action or state expressed by the verb may or may not actually happen. As in English, the Finnish conditional is used in conditional sentences (for example "I would tell you if I knew") and in polite requests (for example "I would like some coffee").

In the former case, and unlike in English, the conditional must be used in both halves of the Finnish sentence:

ymmärtäisin jos puhuisit hitaammin = *"I would understand if you would speak more slowly".

The characteristic morphology of the Finnish conditional is 'isi' inserted between the verb stem and the personal ending. This can result in a closed syllable becoming open and so trigger consonant gradation:

tiedän = 'I know', tietäisin = 'I would know'.
haluan = 'I want', haluaisin = 'I would like'.

Conditional forms exist for both active and passive voices, and for present tense and perfect.

The conditional can be used for added politeness when offering, requesting, or pleading: Ottaisitko kahvia? 'Would you like some coffee?'; Saisinko tuon punaisen? 'May I have that red one?'; Kertoisit nyt 'I do wish you would tell me'.

==== Imperative ====
The imperative mood is used to express commands. In Finnish, there is only one tense form (the present-future). The possible variants of Finnish imperatives are:

- 1st, 2nd or 3rd person
- singular or plural
- active or passive
- positive or negative

===== Active, 2nd-person imperatives =====
These are the most common forms of the imperative: "Do this", "Don't do that".

The singular imperative is simply the verb's present tense without any personal ending (that is, remove the -n from the first-person-singular form):

Active, 2nd-person imperatives
Finnish	English
tule!	'come!'
syö!	'eat!'
huomaa!	'note!'

To make this negative, älä (which is the active imperative singular 2nd person of the negative verb) is placed before the positive form:

Finnish	English
älä sano!	'don't say!'
älä mene!	'don't go!'
älä valehtele!	'don't lie!' (from valehdella "to lie", type II)

To form the plural, add -kaa or -kää to the verb's stem:

Finnish	English
tulkaa!	'come!'
juokaa!	'drink!'
mitatkaa!	'measure!' (from mitata "to measure", type IV)

To make this negative, älkää (which is the active imperative present plural 2nd person of the negative verb) is placed before the positive form and the suffix -ko or -kö is added to the verb stem:

Finnish	English
älkää sanoko!	'don't say!'
älkää menkö!	'don't go!'
älkää tarjotko!	'don't offer!'

Note that 2nd-person-plural imperatives can also be used as polite imperatives when referring to one person.

The Finnish language has no simple equivalent to the English "please". The Finnish equivalent is to use either ole hyvä or olkaa hyvä = 'be good', but it is generally omitted. Politeness is normally conveyed by tone of voice, facial expression, and use of conditional verbs and partitive nouns. For example, voisitteko means "could you", in the polite plural, and is used much like English "Could you..." sentences: voisitteko auttaa "could you help me, please?"

Also, familiar (and not necessarily so polite) expressions can be added to imperatives, e.g. menes, menepä, menehän. These are hard to translate exactly, but extensively used by Finnish speakers themselves. Menes implies expectation, that is, it has been settled already and requires no discussion; menepä has the -pa which indicates insistence, and -hän means approximated "indeed".

===== Passive imperatives =====
Passive imperatives
Finnish	English
tehtäköön	let (something) be done
älköön tehtäkö	let (something) not be done
olkoon tehty	let (something) have been done
älköön olko tehty	let (something) not have been done

===== 3rd-person imperatives =====
The 3rd-person imperatives behave as if they were jussive; besides being used for commands, they can also be used to express permission. In colloquial language, they are most often used to express disregard to what one might or might not do, and the singular and plural forms are often confused.

3rd-person imperatives
Finnish	English
olkoon	'let it (him, her) be'
tehkööt	'let them do'
älköön unohtako	'let him not forget', 'he'd better not forget'
älkööt unohtako	'let them not forget'

===== 1st-person-plural imperatives =====
1st-person-plural imperatives
Finnish	English
menkäämme	'let's go'
älkäämme tehkö	'let us not do', 'we better not do'

The 1st-person imperative sounds archaic, and a form resembling the passive indicative is often used instead: mennään! = 'let's go!'

==== Optative ====
The optative mood is an archaic or poetic variant of the imperative mood that expresses hopes or wishes. It is not used in normal language. Although it in principle has all forms, it is encountered mainly in the 2nd person singular forms -:os/-:ös (replacement of /k/ with the gemination of the previous consonant).

Optative
Finnish	English
ollos	if only/that/would you were
ollos tervehditty	may you be greeted
juossos	may you run
käyttäös	may you use

Optatives are rare even in original archaic poems, and the forms used to express the optative are different from standard Finnish. An example of a true optative is ruvetkommas tappelohon "let's go and start fighting". However, when compiling the Kalevala, Elias Lönnrot tripled the number of optatives, by changing these dialectal forms in the original poems to the standard optative.

==== Potential ====
The potential mood is used to express that the action or state expressed by the verb is possible but not certain. It is relatively rare in modern Finnish, especially in speech. Most commonly it is used in news reports and in official written proposals in meetings. It has only the present tense and perfect. The potential has no specific counterpart in English, but can be translated by adding "possibly" (or occasionally "probably") to the verb.

The characteristic morphology of the Finnish potential is -ne-, inserted between the verb stem and the personal ending. Before this affix, continuants assimilate progressively (pes+ne- → pesse-) and stops regressively (korjat+ne- → korjanne-). The verb olla 'to be' in the potential has the special suppletive form lie-, e.g. the potential of on haettu 'has been fetched' is lienee haettu 'may have been fetched'.

Potential forms exists for both active and passive voices, and for present tense and perfect:

Potential
Finnish	English
lienen	I may be/it's possible that I am
pessee	she may wash/she is [likely] to wash
korjannee	she may fix/she is [likely] to fix
surrevat	it is possible that they are mourning/will mourn
se pestäneen	it will probably be washed (by someone)
lienette nähneet	you may have seen
ei liene annettu	possibly may not have been given (by someone)

In some dialects tullee ('may come') is an indicative form verb (tulee 'comes'). This is not a potential form, but rather due to secondary gemination.

==== Eventive ====
No longer used in modern Finnish, the eventive mood is used in the Kalevala. It is a combination of the potential and the conditional. It is also used in some dialects of Estonian.

Eventive
Finnish	English
kävelleisin	'I probably would walk'

=== Infinitives ===
Finnish verbs are described as having four, sometimes five infinitives:

==== First infinitive ====
The first infinitive short form of a verb is the citation form found in dictionaries. It is not unmarked; its overt marking is always the suffix -a or -ä, though sometimes there are modifications (which may be regarded as stem or ending modifications depending on personal preference).

Verb stem	Finnish infinitive	English infinitive
sano-	sanoa	to say
tietä-	tietää	to know
luke-	lukea	to read

When the stem is itself a single syllable or is of two or more syllables ending in -oi or -öi, the suffix is -da or -dä, respectively. (This represents the historically older form of the suffix, from which the d has been lost in most environments.)

Verb stem	Finnish infinitive	English infinitive
tuo-	tuoda	to bring
jää-	jäädä	to stay
imuroi-	imuroida	to vacuum
epäröi-	epäröidä	to hesitate

If the stem ends in one of the consonants l, r, n, then the final consonant is doubled before adding the infinitive -a or -ä. In the case of a stem ending in the consonant s, the infinitive ending gains the consonant t, becoming -ta or -tä. (These consonant stems take a linking vowel -e- when forming the present tense, or -i- when forming the imperfect, e.g. pestä 'to wash': pesen 'I wash' : pesin 'I washed'). Stems ending in -ts, followed by a link vowel in the present or imperfect, drop the s from the stem before adding the infinitive marker -a or -ä.

Verb stem	Finnish infinitive	English infinitive
men(e)-	mennä	to go
ol(e)-	olla	to be
pur(e)-	purra	to bite
pes(e)-	pestä	to wash
mainits(e)-	mainita	to mention

Some verbs have so called "alternating stems" or multiple stems with weak-strong consonant gradation between them. It depends on the verb if the infinitive is in the strong or weak form. These have long vowel stems in the present/future tense, which already ends with -a or -ä. These verbs drop the a which is present in the present tense stem and replace it with -t in the first infinitive stem followed by the standard -a or -ä first infinitive marker. The a dropping to t weakens a preceding k, p or t so that a weak grade is seen in the first infinitive form. This often creates difficulties for the non-Finn when trying to determine the infinitive (in order to access the translation in a dictionary) when encountering an inflected form. Inflected forms are generally strong except when the stem ending contains a double consonant and there is only a single vowel separating this from the last stem k, p or t.

Inflected Finnish	English	Finnish infinitive	English infinitive	Note
minä putoan	I am falling	pudota	to fall down	putoa- strong grade
minä putosin	I fell down	pudota	to fall down	putosi- strong grade
olen pudonnut	I have fallen down	pudota	to fall down	pudon- weak grade (nn forces weak grade)
he kokoavat	they'll assemble	koota	to assemble	kokoa- strong grade
me kokoamme	we'll assemble	koota	to assemble	kokoa- strong grade (mm does not cause weakness because oa is not a diphthong)

Some verbs lose elements of their stems when forming the first infinitive. Some verbs stem have contracted endings in the first infinitive. Stems ending -ene/-eni in the present/imperfect drop the n and replace it with t, and where applicable, trigger the weak grade in the infinitive stem. The contracted infinitive ending -eta/-etä have -itse/-itsi verbs take the infinitive stem -ita/itä. These contracted verbs may also be subject to consonant weakening when forming the infinitive

e.g. mainita 'to mention' has the longer conjugated stem mainits- as in mainitsen huomenna, että... 'I'll mention tomorrow that...'

e.g. paeta 'to flee' has the longer conjugated stem paken- as in me pakenimme Afganistanista 'we fled from Afghanistan'

The first infinitive long form is the translative plus a possessive suffix (rare in spoken language).

Finnish	English
...soitti sanoakseen...	'...(s/he) phoned in order to say...'
tietääksemme	(idiomatic) 'as far as we know'
voidakseni lukea	'in order for me to be able to read'

The first infinitive only has an active form.

==== Second infinitive ====
The second infinitive is used to express aspects of actions relating to the time when an action takes place or the manner in which an action happens. In equivalent English phrases these time aspects can often be expressed using "when", "while" or "whilst" and the manner aspects using the word "by" or else the gerund, which is formed by adding "-ing" to English verb to express manner.

It is recognizable by the letter e in place of the usual a or ä as the infinitive marker. It is only ever used with one of two case makers; the inessive ssa/ssä indicating time or the instructive n indicating manner. Finnish phrases using the second infinitive can often be rendered in English using the gerund.

The second infinitive is formed by replacing the final a/ä of the first infinitive with e then adding the appropriate inflectional ending. If the vowel before the a/ä is already an e, this becomes i (see example from lukea 'to read').

The cases in which the second infinitive can appear are:

Second infinitive
Finnish	English
Active inessive (while someone is in the act of)
tehdessä	'when doing'
sanoessa	'when saying'
Active inessive + possessive suffix (while themselves in the act of)
lukiessaan	'while he is/was reading'
sanoessasi	'while you are/were saying'
Passive inessive (when or while in the act of something being done)
sanottaessa	'when saying'
tehtäessä	'when doing'
luettaessa	'when reading'
Active instructive (by means of/while in the act of)
tehden	'by doing'
sanoen	'by saying'
lukien	'by reading'
hän tuli itkien huoneeseen	'she came into the room crying'

The inessive form is mostly seen in written forms of language because spoken forms usually express the same idea in longer form using two clauses linked by the word kun ("when"). The instructive is even rarer and mostly exists nowadays in set phrases (for example toisin sanoen = 'in other words').

If the person performing the action of the verb is the same as the person in the equivalent relative clause, then the verb uses the appropriate personal possessive suffix on the verb for the person. If the person in the main clause is different from that in the relative clause then this is indicated by with the person in the genitive and the verb is unmarked for person.

Second infinitive inessive	Equivalent kun phrase	English translation
ollessani Englannissa kävin monessa pubissa	kun olin Englannissa, kävin monessa pubissa	when I was in England, I went into many pubs
ollessaan Englannissa he kävivät monessa pubissa	kun he olivat Englannissa, he kävivät monessa pubissa	when they were in England, they went into many pubs
Jaakon ollessa Englannissa Laura meni Espanjaan	Kun Jaakko oli Englannissa, Laura meni Espanjaan	when Jaakko was in England, Laura went to Spain

==== Third infinitive ====
This corresponds to the English gerund ("verb + -ing" form), and behaves as a noun in Finnish in that it can be inflected, but only in a limited number of cases. It is used to refer to a particular act or occasion of the verb's action.

The third infinitive is formed by taking the verb stem with its consonant in the strong form, then adding ma followed by the case inflection.

The cases in which the third infinitive can appear are:

Case	Finnish	English
inessive	lukemassa	'(in the act of) reading'
inessive	Example: hän on lukemassa kirjastossa	's/he's reading in the library'
elative	lukemasta	'(from just having been) reading'
illative	lukemaan	'(about to be / with the intention of) reading'
adessive	lukemalla	'(by) reading'
abessive	lukematta	'(without) reading'

A rare and archaic form of the third infinitive which occurs with the verb pitää:

Case	Finnish	English
instructive	sinun ei pidä lukeman	'you must not read'

The third infinitive instructive is usually replaced with the first infinitive short form in modern Finnish.

Note that the -ma form without a case ending is called the 'agent participle' (see #Participles below). The agent participle can also be inflected in all cases, producing forms which look similar to the third infinitive.

==== Fourth infinitive ====
The fourth infinitive has the stem ending -minen and indicates obligation, but it is quite rare in Finnish today. This is because there are other words like pitää and täytyy that can convey this meaning.

For example

Fourth Infinitive
Finnish	English
Sinne ei ole menemistä	'There is no going there' i.e. 'One must not go there'

Though not an infinitive, a much more common -minen verbal stem ending is the noun construct which gives the name of the activity described by the verb. This is rather similar to the English verbal noun '-ing' form, and therefore as a noun, this form can inflect just like any other noun.

-minen noun formation
Finnish	English
lukeminen on hauskaa	'reading is fun'
vihaan lukemista	'I hate reading'
nautin lukemisesta	'I enjoy reading'

==== Fifth infinitive ====
This is a fairly rare form which has the meaning 'on the point of ...ing / just about to ...'

Fifth infinitive
Finnish	English
olin lukemaisillani	'I was just about to read'

=== Verb conjugation ===
For full details of how verbs are conjugated in Finnish, please refer to the Finnish verb conjugation article.

=== Participles ===
Finnish verbs have past and present participles, both with passive and active forms, and an 'agent' participle. Participles can be used in different ways than ordinary adjectives and they can have an object.

==== Past passive participle ====
This is formed in the same way as the passive perfect or passive past-perfect forms, by taking the passive past form, removing the -tiin ending and replacing it with -ttu/tty (depending on vowel harmony)

Finnish	English
lähdettyäsi kotiin	'after you went home' [pass. II participle sg. ess. + poss. suffix]

==== Past active participle ====
Basically this is formed by removing the infinitive ending and adding -nut/nyt (depending on vowel harmony) and in some cases -lut/lyt, -sut/syt, -rut/ryt. For example:

1st infinitive	active past participle
puhua	puhunut
syödä	syönyt

However, depending on the verb's stem type, assimilation can occur with the consonant of the stem ending.

In type II verbs, and n, l, r or s in the stem ending is assimilated to the consonant in the participle ending (as also happens in formation of the first infinitive, although -s stem endings take an extra t in the first infinitive)

1st Infinitive	Stem	Active past participle
mennä	(men-)	mennyt
pestä	(pes-)	pessyt
harjoitella	(harjoittel-)	harjoitellut

The assimilation causes the final consonant cluster to be strengthened which in turn can weaken a strong cluster if one exists in the stem. See harjoitella above.

In verbs of types IV, V and VI, the t at the end of the stem is assimilated to the n:

1st infinitive	Stem	Active past participle
haluta	(halut-)	halunnut
tarvita	(tarvit-)	tarvinnut
rohjeta	(rohjet-)	rohjennut

==== Present passive participle ====
The present passive participle can be constructed from the past passive form of the verb. The -iin ending of the past passive is replaced with -ava/ävä, which can be inflected in the same way as the present active participle. For example:

Infinitive	Past passive	Passive participle	English
antaa	annettiin	annettava	which is to be given
syödä	syötiin	syötävä	which is to be eaten
kertoa	kerrottiin	kerrottava	which is to be told

It is possible to translate this participle in several related ways e.g. sanottava 'which must be/is to be said', 'which can be said', 'which will be said' or 'which is said'. Here are some sentences and phrases further illustrating the formation and use of the present passive participle:

Finnish	English
Juotava vesi	Drinkable water
Onko sinulla mitään sanottavaa?	Do you have anything to say?
Onko pöydässä jotakin syötävää?	Is there anything to eat on the table? Or even, Is there anything edible on the table?

This participle can also be used in other ways. If used with the appropriate third-person singular form of the verb olla and with the subject in the genitive it can express necessity or obligation.

Minun on lähdettävä 'I must leave'
Heidän olisi mentävä 'They would have to go'

Inflected in the inessive plural, it can be used in conjunction with the verb 'to be' to indicate that something can or cannot be done.

Onko Pekka tavattavissa? 'Is Pekka available?'/'Is Pekka able to be met with?'

==== Present active participle ====
This participle is formed simply by finding the 3rd person plural form of the verb and removing -t, and acts as an adjective describing what the object or subject of the sentence is doing, for example:

Present active participle
Finnish	English
nukku|va koira	'sleeping dog'
häikäise|vä valo	'blinding light'
olin luke|v|i|na|ni	'I pretended to be reading' [act. I participle pl. essive + poss. suffix]

==== Agent participle ====
The agent participle is formed in a similar way as the third infinitive (see above), adding -ma or -mä to the verb stem. It allows the property of being a target of an action to be formatted as an adjective-like attribute. Like adjectives, it can be inflected in all cases. For example, ihmisen tekemä muodostelma "a man-made formation". The party performing the action is indicated by the use of genitive, or by a possessive suffix. This is reflected in English, too: ihmisen tekemä – "of man's making", or kirjoittamani kirja "book of my writing". For example:

Agent participle
Finnish	English
tytön lukema kirja	the book read by the girl
tytön lukemaa kirjaa	(partitive) the book read by the girl
tytön lukemassa kirjassa	in the book read by the girl
etc.

It is not required for the action to be in the past, although the examples above are. Rather, the construction simply specifies the subject, the object and the action, with no reference to time. For an example in the future, consider: huomenna käyttämänänne välineenä on... "tomorrow, as the instrument you will be using is...". Here, käyttämä "that which is used" describes, i.e. is an attribute to väline "instrument". (Notice the case agreement between käyttämä-nä and välinee-nä.) The suffix -nne "your" specifies the person "owning" the action, i.e. who does it, thus käyttämänne is "that which was used by you(pl.)", and käyttämänänne is "as that which was used by you".

It is also possible to give the actor with a pronoun, e.g. sinun käyttämäsi "that which was used by you". In standard language, the pronoun sinun "your" is not necessary, but the possessive suffix is. In inexact spoken usage, this goes vice versa; the possessive suffix is optional, and used typically only for the second-person singular, e.g. sun käyttämäs.

=== Negation of verbs ===
==== Present indicative ====
Verbs are negated by using a negative verb in front of the stem from the present tense (in its 'weak' consonant form). This verb form used with the negative verb is called a connegative.

Present indicative
Finnish	English		Finnish	English
Singular
tiedän	'I know'	→	en tiedä	'I don't know'
tiedät	'you know'	→	et tiedä	'you don't know'
tietää	'(s)he knows'	→	ei tiedä	'(s)he doesn't know'
Plural
tiedämme	'we know'	→	emme tiedä	'we don't know'
tiedätte	'you know'	→	ette tiedä	'you don't know'
tietävät	'they know'	→	eivät tiedä	'they don't know'

Note that the inflection is on the negative verb, not on the main verb, and that the endings are regular apart from the 3rd-person forms.

==== Present passive ====
The negative is formed from the third-person singular "negative verb" ei and the present passive with the final -an removed:

Finnish	English
ei puhuta	'it is not spoken'
ei tiedetä	'it is not known'

==== Imperfect indicative ====
The negative is formed from the appropriate part of the negative verb followed by the nominative form (either singular or plural depending on the number of the verb's subject) of the active past participle. So for puhua the pattern is:

Imperfect indicative
Finnish	English
Singular
en puhunut	'I did not speak'
et puhunut	'you did not speak'
ei puhunut	'(s/he) did not speak'
Plural
emme puhuneet	'we did not speak'
ette puhuneet	'you did not speak'
eivät puhuneet	'they did not speak'

Note one exception: when the 'te' 2nd-person plural form is used in an honorific way to address one person, the singular form of the participle is used: te ette puhunut = 'you (sg. polite) did not speak'.

==== Imperfect passive ====
The negative is formed from the third-person singular negative verb – 'ei' – and the nominative singular form of the passive present participle (compare this with the negative of the imperfect indicative):

Imperfect passive
Finnish	English
ei puhuttu	'it was not spoken'
ei tiedetty	'it was not known'

Note that in the spoken language, this form is used for the first-person plural. In this case, the personal pronoun is obligatory:

Finnish	English
me ei menty	'we did not go'

== Adverbs ==
A very common way of forming adverbs is by adding the ending -sti to the inflecting form of the corresponding adjective:

Adverbs
Finnish	English
nopea, nopeasti	'quick, quickly'
kaunis, kauniisti	'beautiful, beautifully'
hidas, hitaasti	'slow, slowly'
helppo, helposti	'easy, easily'

Adverbs modify verbs, not nouns, therefore they do not inflect. -sti adverbs are not used to modify adjectives (such as to express degree) like -ly adverbs might be in English; the genitive of adjectives is used for this purpose.

=== Comparative formation ===
The comparative form of the adverb has the ending -mmin.

Comparative formation
Finnish	English
nopea, nopeasti, nopeammin	'quick, quickly, more quickly/faster'
kaunis, kauniisti, kauniimmin	'beautiful, beautifully, more beautifully'
hidas, hitaasti, hitaammin	'slow, slowly, more slowly'
helppo, helposti, helpommin	'easy, easily, more easily'

=== Superlative formation ===
The superlative form of the adverb has the ending -immin.

Superlative formation
Finnish	English
helppo, helposti, helpommin, helpoimmin	'easy, easily, more easily, most easily'

Because of the -i-, the stem vowel can change, similarly to superlative adjectives, or to avoid runs of three vowels:

Finnish	English
nopea, nopeasti, nopeammin, nopeimmin	'quick, quickly, more quickly/faster, fastest'
kaunis, kauniisti, kauniimmin, kauneimmin	'beautiful, beautifully, more beautifully, most beautifully'
hidas, hitaasti, hitaammin, hitaimmin	'slow, slowly, more slowly, most slowly'

=== Irregular forms ===
There are a number of irregular adverbs, including:

Irregular forms
Finnish	English
hyvä, hyvin, paremmin, parhaiten	'good, well, better, best'

== Numbers ==
The ordinary counting numbers (cardinals) from 0 to 10 are given in the table below. Cardinal numbers may be inflected and some of the inflected forms are irregular in form.

Cardinal numbers and key inflected forms
Number	Nominative	Genitive	Partitive	Illative
0	nolla	nollan	nollaa	nollaan
1	yksi	yhden	yhtä	yhteen
2	kaksi	kahden	kahta	kahteen
3	kolme	kolmen	kolmea	kolmeen
4	neljä	neljän	neljää	neljään
5	viisi	viiden	viittä	viiteen
6	kuusi	kuuden	kuutta	kuuteen
7	seitsemän	seitsemän	seitsemää (*)	seitsemään
8	kahdeksan	kahdeksan	kahdeksaa	kahdeksaan
9	yhdeksän	yhdeksän	yhdeksää	yhdeksään
10	kymmenen	kymmenen	kymmentä	kymmeneen

(*) sometimes seitsentä (alternative form)

In colloquial spoken Finnish, the numerals usually appear in contracted forms.

To form teens, toista is added to the base number. Toista is the partitive form of toinen, meaning here "second group of ten". Hyphens are written here to separate morphemes. In Finnish text, hyphens are not written.

- yksi-toista, kaksi-toista, ... yhdeksän-toista

"one of the second, two of the second, ... nine of the second"
11, 12, ... 19

In older Finnish, until about the early 20th Century, the same pattern was used up to one hundred: kolmeneljättä 'thirty-three'.

== Sentence structure ==
=== Word order ===
Since Finnish is an agglutinative language, word order within sentences can be much freer than, for example, English. In English, the strong subject–verb–object order typically indicates the function of a noun as either subject or object, although some English structures allow this to be reversed. In Finnish sentences, however, the role of the noun is determined not by word order or sentence structure as in English but by case markings which indicate subject and object.

The most usual neutral order, however, is subject–verb–object. But usually what the speaker or writer is talking about is at the head of the sentence.

Finnish	English	Note
koira puri miestä	'the dog bit the man'	we are talking of the dog and what it did
miestä puri koira	'the man was bitten by a/the dog'	we are talking about the man and what it was that bit him, e.g. not a snake
koira miestä puri	'it was a dog that bit the man'	we are confirming that it was a/the dog that bit the man, not some other animal

Here koira ('dog') is in the nominative form but mies ('man') is marked as object by the case marked form miestä. This sentence is a bald statement of fact. Changing the word order changes the emphasis slightly but not the fundamental meaning of the sentence.

Finnish	English	Note
minulla on rahaa	'I have money'	a bald statement of fact
rahaa minulla on	'money is something I do have'	although I may not have something else
rahaa on minulla	'The money is with me'	I am telling you where the money is
minulla rahaa on	'I've definitely got (the) money'	I am confirming that I do have (the) money
on minulla rahaa	'Yes, I do have (the) money'	if having money has been questioned

Minulla here is the word minä (I) in a case form ending -lla which when used with the verb olla (to be, expressed here in the form on) expresses ownership. This is because Finnish does not have a verb form equivalent of the English word 'have'. Minulla is not considered the subject.

And finally, a classic example:

Finnish	Translation
minä olen valtio	'I am the state' (matter-of-fact)
valtio olen minä	'L'État, c'est moi' (French – attributed to Louis XIV)

Besides the word-order implications of turning a sentence into a question, there are some other circumstances where word-order is important:

=== Existential sentences ===
These are sentences which introduce a new subject – they often begin with 'there is' or 'there are' in English.

Finnish	English
huoneessa on sänky	'there is a bed in the room'

The location of the thing whose existence is being stated comes first, followed by its stative verb, followed by the thing itself. Note how this is unlike the normal English equivalent, though English can also use the same order:

Finnish	English
siellä seisoi mies	'(in/out) there stood a man'

=== Forming questions ===
There are two main ways of forming a question – either using a specific question word, or by adding a -ko/-kö suffix to one of the words in a sentence. A question word is placed first in the sentence, and a word with the interrogative suffix is also moved to this position:

Interrogatives (questions)
Finnish	English
mikä tämä on?	'what is this?'
tämä on kirja	'this is a book'
onko tämä kirja?	'is this a book?'
tämäkö on kirja?	'is this a book?'
kirjako tämä on?	'is this a book?'
eikö tämä ole kirja?	'is this not a book?' (note the -kö goes on the negative verb)

=== Forming answers ===
The response to a question will of course depend on the situation, but grammatically the response to a question typically follows the grammatical structure in the question. Thus a question structured in the inessive case (e.g. missä kaupungissa asut? 'in which town do you live?') will have an answer that is also in the inessive (e.g. Espoossa 'in Espoo') unless special rules dictate otherwise. Questions which in English would be answered with 'yes' or 'no' replies are usually responded to by repeating the verb in either the affirmative or negative.

Interrogatives (questions)
Finnish	English
mihin päin ne lähtee?	'which way are they headed?'
Helsinkiin	'towards Helsinki'
onko sinulla avain?	'have you got the key?'
on/ei ole	'yes'/'no' (lit. 'is'/'is not' in possession)
menettekö leffaan?	'are you guys going to the movies?'
menemme/emme mene	'yes'/'no' (lit. 'we are going'/'we are not going')
aiotko lähteä ilman pipoa?	'Are you intending to go off without a hat?'
aion	'Yes' (lit. 'I intend')

The words kyllä and ei are often shown in dictionaries as being equivalent to 'yes' and 'no', but the situation is a little more complicated than that. The typical response to a question which in English is answered 'yes' or 'no' is, as we see above, more usually answered by repeating the verb in either an affirmative or negative form in the appropriate person. The word 'kyllä' is rather a strong affirmation in response to a question and is similar to the word 'niin' which is an affirmation of a response to a statement of fact or belief. (However, in conversations, niin may even simply mean that the sentence was heard, not expressing any sort of concurrence. The same problem occurs with the colloquial joo "yeah".)

Kyllä and Niin
Finnish	English
aiotko lähteä ilman pipoa? (question)	'Are you intending to go off without a hat?'
kyllä	'Yes, I sure am' (Strong affirmation. I really do intend to go bareheaded)
on hölmöä lähteä ulos talviaikana ilman pipoa (statement)	'it is foolish to go out in wintertime without a hat'
niin	'Yes indeed' (I agree with your statement)

The word ei is the negative verb form and has to be inflected for person and the verb itself is usually present, though not always.

osaatko sinä saksaa? 'can you (speak) German?'

en ('no'; lit. 'I don't')

or better

en osaa ('I can't')

== See also ==
- Finnish
- Finnish phonology
- Finnish numerals
- Iso suomen kielioppi
