= Finnish conjugation =

Aspect of verbs in the Finnish language

Verbs in the Finnish language can be divided into six main groups depending on the stem type, both for formal analysis and for teaching the language to non-native speakers. All six types have the same set of personal endings, but the stems assume different suffixes and undergo slightly different changes when inflected.

The article on Finnish language grammar has more about verbs and other aspects of Finnish grammar.

== Tables of conjugation ==
Tables of conjugation are given here for the regular type I verb, puhua (to speak), as used in the formal, written language. Verb conjugation in everyday spoken language is somewhat different.

=== Basic tenses in the indicative mood ===
			indicative mood							
active voice			present tense		imperfect (past)		present perfect		pluperfect (past perfect)	
per.	no.	pron.	affirmative	negative	affirmative	negative	affirmative	negative	affirmative	negative
1st	sg.	minä	puhun	en puhu	puhuin	en puhunut	olen puhunut	en ole puhunut	olin puhunut	en ollut puhunut
2nd	sg.	sinä	puhut	et puhu	puhuit	et puhunut	olet puhunut	et ole puhunut	olit puhunut	et ollut puhunut
3rd	sg.	hän	puhuu	ei puhu	puhui	ei puhunut	on puhunut	ei ole puhunut	oli puhunut	ei ollut puhunut
1st	pl.	me	puhumme	emme puhu	puhuimme	emme puhuneet	olemme puhuneet	emme ole puhuneet	olimme puhuneet	emme olleet puhuneet
2nd	pl.	te	puhutte	ette puhu	puhuitte	ette puhuneet	olette puhuneet	ette ole puhuneet	olitte puhuneet	ette olleet puhuneet
3rd	pl.	he	puhuvat	eivät puhu	puhuivat	eivät puhuneet	ovat puhuneet	eivät ole puhuneet	olivat puhuneet	eivät olleet puhuneet
passive voice			puhutaan	ei puhuta	puhuttiin	ei puhuttu	on puhuttu	ei ole puhuttu	oli puhuttu	ei ollut puhuttu

The present, imperfect, perfect, and pluperfect correspond fairly well to English: 'speaks', 'spoke', 'has spoken', and 'had spoken', in the active voice, or 'it is spoken', 'it was spoken', 'it has been spoken', and 'it had been spoken', in the passive voice. The auxiliary verb ei used for negation, usually with the naked stem of the main verb but with the past participle in the negative imperfect. Finnish lacks a true future tense so, normally, the present tense is used for future time as well.

=== Conditional and potential mood ===
			conditional mood				potential mood			
active voice			present tense		perfect		present tense		perfect	
per.	no.	pron.	affirmative	negative	affirmative	negative	affirmative	negative	affirmative	negative
1st	sg.	minä	puhuisin	en puhuisi	olisin puhunut	en olisi puhunut	puhunen	en puhune	lienen puhunut	en liene puhunut
2nd	sg.	sinä	puhuisit	et puhuisi	olisit puhunut	et olisi puhunut	puhunet	et puhune	lienet puhunut	et liene puhunut
3rd	sg.	hän	puhuisi	ei puhuisi	olisi puhunut	ei olisi puhunut	puhunee	ei puhune	lienee puhunut	ei liene puhunut
1st	pl.	me	puhuisimme	emme puhuisi	olisimme puhuneet	emme olisi puhuneet	puhunemme	emme puhune	lienemme puhuneet	emme liene puhuneet
2nd	pl.	te	puhuisitte	ette puhuisi	olisitte puhuneet	ette olisi puhuneet	puhunette	ette puhune	lienette puhuneet	ette liene puhuneet
3rd	pl.	he	puhuisivat	eivät puhuisi	olisivat puhuneet	eivät olisi puhuneet	puhunevat	eivät puhune	lienevät puhuneet	eivät liene puhuneet
passive voice			puhuttaisiin	ei puhuttaisi	olisi puhuttu	ei olisi puhuttu	puhuttaneen	ei puhuttane	lienee puhuttu	ei liene puhuttu

The conditional mood corresponds mostly to 'would' or 'should', or to the past subjunctive, in English, although Finnish lacks a subjunctive mood. The potential mood is rather rare, and corresponds to 'may' or 'might' in English. The perfect forms of these moods are easily understood as 'would have', 'should have', 'might have', etc.

=== Imperative mood and miscellaneous tenses ===
			imperative mood				indicative mood			
active voice			present tense		perfect		present prospective		imperfect prospective	
per.	no.	pron.	affirmative	negative	affirmative	negative	affirmative	negative	affirmative	negative
1st	sg.	minä	—	—	—	—	olen puhuva	en ole puhuva	olin puhuva	en ollut puhuva
2nd	sg.	sinä	puhu	älä puhu	ole puhunut	älä ole puhunut	olet puhuva	et ole puhuva	olit puhuva	et ollut puhuva
3rd	sg.	hän	puhukoon	älköön puhuko	olkoon puhunut	älköön olko puhunut	on puhuva	ei ole puhuva	oli puhuva	ei ollut puhuva
1st	pl.	me	puhukaamme	älkäämme puhuko	olkaamme puhuneet	älkäämme olko puhuneet	—	—	—	—
2nd	pl.	te	puhukaa	älkää puhuko	olkaa puhuneet	älkää olko puhuneet	—	—	—	—
3rd	pl.	he	puhukoot	älkööt puhuko	olkoot puhuneet	älkööt olko puhuneet	—	—	—	—
passive voice			puhuttakoon	ei puhuttako — älköön puhuttako	olkoon puhuttu	älköön olko puhuttu	on puhuttava	ei ole puhuttava	oli puhuttava	ei ollut puhuttava

The first and third person imperative forms here correspond to English 'let us speak', 'let him not speak', 'let it not be spoken', etc. The perfect imperative is still valid, if somewhat awkward and contrived, as it is in English: 'let it (not) have been spoken'. The first person plural imperative puhukaamme sounds rather formal and archaic; thus, in everyday speech, the passive present indicative, puhutaan, is used, but it may not quite be considered correct. There are many variations of the imperative forms: in old writings, one may also see the forms puhukaat or puhukaatte for the second person plural, puhukaan for the third person plural, or puhuttakaan for the passive. In the passive or third person, the imperative is sometimes used for the present or perfect subjunctive of other languages, a mood lacking in Finnish.

The present prospective and the imperfect prospective correspond best to 'I am to speak' and 'I was to speak' in English. It is not correct Finnish to use these tenses in the plural: the plural form of the present participle, puhuvat, would be confusing if used in this sense, as it is too similar to the third person plural present indicative. Despite the apparently equivalent use of the present participle, the grammatical aspect of these tenses is prospective rather than continuous or progressive as in English.

=== Verbs of obligation in the agent construction ===
Verbs of obligation such as täytyä (must), tarvita (need to), pitää (ought to), and tulla (shall) are often used in the agent form of construction, in which the verb is not conjugated for person but is in the impersonal third person singular. Here:

- the person or persons bearing the obligation are regarded as the 'agent' (not the subject) and in the genitive case
- the verb of obligation is in the impersonal third person singular regardless of the plurality and person of the agent.
- this is followed by another verb or verb phrase in which the verb is in the short from first infinitive (the dictionary form) and which is then regarded as the sentence's subject.

Thus:

- Heidän täytyy puhua minun kanssani = they must speak with me
- Minun täytyy puhua heidän kanssansa = I must speak with them
- Sinun ei tarvitse tehdä tuota = you don't need to do that
- Ei sinun pidä tappaman = thou shalt not kill
  - Note the archaic use of the instructive case of the third infinitive. A common error, even for native Finns, is to confuse this with the illative case, tappamaan, which would be incorrect. Now, the first infinitive is used with pitää.
- Sinun pitäisi tulla huomenna = you should come tomorrow.

There is no equivalent of this type of construction in English.

The verb täytyä can only be used in this construction and therefore has no other personal forms. The other verbs can carry personal endings in other forms of construction with the normal subject, verb, and object, in which the obligation is less strong or in which the verb takes on a different meaning altogether.

- (Minä) tarvitsen apua = I need help; expressing need without obligation
- (Minä) pidän hänestä = I like him/her; verb has a different meaning

== Infinitives and participles ==
In Finnish there are five infinitive forms, with past and present participles for both active and passive voices.

=== Infinitive I ===
The first infinitive is the dictionary form of the verb puhu-a (to speak), stem puhu, and it corresponds in meaning and function to the English infinitive introduced by the particle 'to'. The suffix of the first infinitive depends on the type of the verb stem. With so-called "vowel" stems, (see verbs of Type I, below), the first infinitive suffix is ‑a/‑ä, whereas with "consonantal" stems, (types IV-VI), the suffix is most often ‑ta/‑tä. With vowel stems that consist of a single open syllable ending in a long vowel or a diphthong or longer stems that end in such syllables, (type II), the infinitive suffix is ‑da/‑dä: saa‑da = 'to get', syö‑dä = 'to eat', reagoi‑da = 'to react'. The first infinitive of consonantal stems always has the weak consonant grade in the stem, e.g., karata (to flee), stem karkaa‑.

It can be used in a sentence similarly to the English infinitive and stand for a subject or a direct object, without any additional inflection. It is also governed by modal verbs like saattaa (might) or voida (be able to): saattaa mennä = 'might go'; voi hakea = 'can fetch'.

It has a so-called "long form", with the ending of the nominal translative case and an obligatory possessive suffix. The long form is usually associated with the literary register. It connotes either extent or intent:

- muista‑a = to remember
  - muista‑a‑kse‑ni = 'as far as I can remember' (extent), or 'in order that I might remember' (intent), lit. 'for my remembering'.
- näh‑dä = to see
  - näh‑dä‑kse‑en = 'as far as he/she/it/they can see' (extent), 'so that they could see' (intent).

In spoken Finnish, intent is often expressed with the short form infinitive, if the subject is implicit or understood by context, or more explicitly with a subordinate clause containing a conditional verb: että minä muistaisin. Nevertheless, the long form is still used to signify extent; another example: tietä‑ä = 'to know', tietä‑ä‑kse‑ni = 'as far as I know'.

The first infinitive generally takes on no inflected forms. It appears only in the short (dictionary) form and in the long form, and the long form is not used without a possessive suffix.

=== Infinitive II ===
The second infinitive may be formed from the first infinitive by replacing the final 'a/ä' with an 'e'. It occurs in the instructive and inessive cases. If the second infinitive has a subject, the subject is put in the genitive case; in the inessive case, the second infinitive also accepts a possessive suffix if it is appropriate.

The instructive form conveys manner of action corresponding approximately with '‑ing' or '‑ingly' in English, less commonly with '‑ande/ende' in Swedish and very commonly with '‑ant' in French. It is parallel in function and meaning to the Russian adverbial participle (as opposed to the adjectival participle):

- tietäen, 'knowingly' (instructive)
  - tietäen että hänen täytyisi puhua = knowing that he would have to speak = French: sachant qu'il aurait besoin de parler = Russian: зная, что ему следовало бы говорить, romanized: znaya, chto yemu sledovalo by govorit.
- näin puhuen = thus speaking (instructive).

The inessive form conveys coterminal action: something happening at the same time as something else. More properly, it is seen as some action whose accomplishment simultaneously brings about the accomplishment of something else. It corresponds approximately in English to the use of 'when', 'while', or the somewhat archaic or British 'whilst'; strict coterminality is still expressed in English with 'in' or 'by', the present participle '-ing' and any subject in the possessive case in a manner analogous to the Finnish, like in French with 'en' and the present participle ‑ant:

- kuollessa = 'in dying' or 'while dying' = French: en mourant (inessive) = Russian: умирая, romanized: umiraya.
- Varas iski uhrin syödessä aamupalaa = the thief struck whilst the victim was eating breakfast

The inessive of this infinitive also has a passive form: tiedettäessä = 'in being known', said of some fact.

=== Infinitive III ===
The third infinitive is formed by adding the ending -ma/mä to the hard grade of the present stem. It is a noun in its own right, denoting "the act" of a verb. It is fully declinable as a noun, but some of the cases have special or commonly understood meanings.

The illative of the third infinitive is a common inchoative, governed by such verbs as ruveta and joutua:

- hän rupesi saarnaamaan = he began to preach
- häntä ei mennä neuvomaan = you don't go and advise him

The elative is used in the sense of forbidding or discouraging an action:

- poikia kiellettiin polttamasta = the boys were forbidden from smoking

The adessive is used to tell how the action is done.

- jätteet hävitettiin polttamalla = the waste was destroyed by burning

==== Agentive participle ====
In Finnish, the passive participle cannot be used when the agent is expressed. Finnish uses forms ending in -ma/mä that are formally identical to the third infinitive. Some authors include it as one of the uses of the third infinitive; others list it under the special name "agentive participle". The agentive participle is never used when the agent is not expressed, and it must be used in all situations that one wishes to use the passive and express the agent:

- Talo on Pekan maalaama = the house was painted by Pekka
- Pekan maalaama talo = the house painted by Pekka
- Talo on (sinun) maalaamasi = the house was painted by you

As expected for a participle, it agrees with the head noun; in the following, the ending -mia and kirjeitä (letters) are in the partitive plural:

- pojan viime viikolla Japanista ystävilleen kirjoittamia kirjeitä = (some of) the letters written by the boy to his friends last week from Japan
- polttamallani sormella en voinut kirjoittaa = I couldn't type with the finger I burned
- kun toimimme neuvomallasi tavalla kaikki onnistui = when we did it the way you advised, all went well

=== Infinitive IV ===
The fourth infinitive is formed just like the third but with the ending ‑minen, which is declined like all other Finnish nouns in ‑nen. It is also a noun, but its meaning is more 'the process' rather than the very act of a verb. This often corresponds to '‑ation' words in English:

- käyminen = '(the process of) going', which can mean 'fermentation' among other things.

The use of this form as a proper infinitive rather than an "action noun" is generally restricted to forms such as the following, in which it implies a sort of obligation:

- minun on tekeminen jotakin = it is up to me to do something
- on tekeminen jotakin = something ought to be done
- heidän ei ole kysymistä ... = theirs is not to ask ...
- tästä ei ole puhumista = this is not to be spoken of.

It also appears in this construction, where the finite verb is repeated in the partitive with a possessive suffix:

- hän puhui puhumistaan = he talked and talked.

=== Infinitive V ===
The rarely used fifth infinitive is a "diminutive" of the third infinitive. It is apparently used only in the adessive plural with a possessive suffix. It indicates that, at some point, the action of the verb is "but little" accomplished:

- olin puhumaisillani = I was just starting to speak.

=== Present participles ===
==== Active ====
The active present participle is formed by adding ‑va/vä to the hard grade of the present indicative stem of the verb.

- tulevat päivät ovat tuulisia = the coming days are (going to be) windy.

In the nominative plural, the form nearly always coincides with the third person plural present indicative.

==== Passive ====
There is also a passive present participle formed by adding the same ending to the passive stem:

- puhuttava = to be spoken of.

This form is also ambiguous: it could equally well be the active present participle of the causative puhuttaa, 'to cause (someone) to speak', thus:

- puhuttava = (active) making (someone) speak
- puhutettava = (passive) being made to speak.

=== Past participles ===
==== Active ====
The active past participle is usually formed by adding -nut/nyt to the short stem, omitting any epenthetic vowel. Verbs of type III (ending in ‑lla/llä, ‑rra/rrä, and ‑sta/stä) assimilate the n of this ending:

- tullut = (one that has) come
- purrut = (one that has) bitten
- pessyt = (one that has) washed.

The stem of the active past participle, for all other cases except the nominative singular, ends in ‑nee‑, which may be likewise assimilated. See tables of conjugation.

==== Agentive ====
See Agentive Participle above.

==== Passive ====
The passive past participle has the ending ‑tu/ty or ‑ttu/tty to the soft grade of the stem. For a verb of type I, a final ‑a/ä‑ of the stem is replaced by ‑e‑ for the passive past participle:

- antaa = to give
- annettu = (that has been) given.

The passive past participle is subject to consonant gradation:

- tt → t;

and for verbs of type III:

- lt → ll
- nt → nn
- rt → rr
- st → st.

Thus:

- annettu = (that has been) given; annetut = (that have been) given, (pl.)
- purtu = (one that has been) bitten, graded as purru-, hence purrun = of that which has been bitten
- pesty = (that has been) washed, unchanged in soft grade, hence pestyt hiukset = hair that has been washed (pl. of hius, 'a single hair').

===== Derived passive forms =====
All other passive forms of the verb may be regularly derived from the passive past participle by replacing the final ‑u/y with the following endings:

- in the hard grade:
  - ‑iin: passive imperfect; annettiin = was given
  - ‑ava: passive present participle; annettava = that which is (to be) given
  - ‑aisiin/äisiin: passive conditional; annettaisiin = would be given
  - ‑aisi/äisi: passive conditional connegative with negative verb ei; ei annettaisi = would not be given
  - ‑aneen/äneen: passive potential; annettaneen = might be given
  - ‑ane/äne: passive potential connegative; ei annettane = might not be given
  - ‑akoon/äköön, ‑akaan/äkään: passive imperative; annettakoon = shall be given
  - ‑ako/äkö: passive imperative connegative; ei annettako = shall not be given
- in the soft grade:
  - ‑aan/ään: passive present indicative; annetaan = is given
  - ‑a/ä: passive present indicative connegative with negative verb ei; ei anneta = is not given.

== Overview of main verb types ==
The following table shows the basic changes and marks for conjugating each of the types of Finnish verbs:

Type	Example	1. Pers. Pres.	3. Pers. imp. (past)	Participle	Passive	Passive Imp. (past)	Infinitive ends in	Translation
I-a	puhua	puhun	puhui	puhunut	puhutaan	puhuttiin	-oa/öä, -ua/yä	to speak
I-b	oppia	opin	oppi	oppinut	opitaan	opittiin	-ea/eä, -ia/iä	to learn
I-c	antaa	annan	antoi	antanut	annetaan	annettiin	-aa, 1. vowel a/e/i	to give
I-d	johtaa	johdan	johti	johtanut	johdetaan	johdettiin	-aa, 1. vowel o/u	to lead
I-e	kieltää	kiellän	kielsi	kieltänyt	kielletään	kiellettiin	-ää	to forbid
II-a	saada	saan	sai	saanut	saadaan	saatiin	(long vowel)+da/dä	to get
II-b	syödä	syön	söi	syönyt	syödään	syötiin	(diphthong)+da/dä	to eat
III	tulla	tulen	tuli	tullut	tullaan	tultiin	-lla/llä, -nna/nnä, -rra/rrä, -sta/stä	to come
IV	haluta	haluan	halusi	halunnut	halutaan	haluttiin	-ata/ätä, -ota/ötä, -uta/ytä	to want
V	tarvita	tarvitsen	tarvitsi	tarvinnut	tarvitaan	tarvittiin	-ita/itä	to need
VI	paeta	pakenen	pakeni	paennut	paetaan	paettiin	-eta/etä	to flee

== Type I verbs ==
These are verbs whose infinitive forms end in vowel + a/ä, such as puhua = 'to speak', tietää = 'to know'. The group contains a very large number of verbs. Tietää conjugates in the present indicative as:

- minä tiedän = I know
- sinä tiedät = you (singular) know
- hän/se tietää = (s)he/it knows
- se tietää = (s)he/it knows (colloquial)
- me tiedämme = we know
- te tiedätte = you (plural/formal) know
- he/ne tietävät = they know
- ne tietää = they know (colloquial)

The personal endings are -n, -t, -(doubled final vowel), -mme, -tte, -vat. The inflecting stem is formed by dropping the final -a/ä of the infinitive and has a strong-grade consonant in the third-person forms and weak-grade elsewhere. For the third person plural, it is an exception to the general rule for strong grade.

=== Past tense ===
In the simple case (which applies to most type I verbs), the imperfect indicative is formed by inserting the characteristic marker i between the stem and the personal endings, which are the same as in the present tense except that the vowel does not double in the third person singular:

- puhun = 'I speak', puhuin = 'I spoke'
- puhut = 'you speak', puhuit = 'you spoke'
- puhuu = '(he) speaks', puhui = '(he) spoke'
- puhumme = 'we speak', puhuimme = 'we spoke' and so on.

However, the insertion of the i often has an effect on the stem. Of type I verbs, one notable exception is tietää:

- tiedän = 'I know', tiesin = 'I knew'

Ymmärtää (to understand) also follows this pattern. Changes of stem for other verb types will be discussed in the relevant sections below.

=== Passive ===
==== Present passive ====
The present passive is formed by adding -taan to the inflecting stem of the verb with the consonant in its weak form:

- puhua $\rightarrow$ puhu- $\rightarrow$ puhutaan

If the vowel at the end of the stem is a or ä, it is changed to e before the -taan ending:

- tietää $\rightarrow$ tiedä- $\rightarrow$ tiede $\rightarrow$ tiedetään

==== Past passive ====
It is formed in the same way as the present passive, except that the ending is -ttiin: puhuttiin = 'it was spoken', tiedettiin = 'it was known'.

Note the presence of the same i marker in the past passive as in the imperfect indicative and the presence of the extra t.

==== Conditional passive ====
It is formed in the same way as the present passive, except that the ending is -ttaisiin, hence puhuttaisiin = 'it would be spoken', tiedettäisiin = 'it would be known'.

Note the presence of the isi conditional marker.

==== Potential passive ====
It is formed in the same way as the present passive, except that the ending is -ttaneen, hence puhuttaneen = 'it may be spoken', tiedettäneen = 'it may be known'.

Note the presence of the ne potential marker.

== Type II verbs ==
These are verbs whose first infinitive ends in vowel + da (juoda = 'to drink', syödä = 'to eat'). It is a fairly large group of verbs, partly because one way in which foreign borrowings are incorporated into the Finnish verb paradigms is to add oida: organisoida = 'to organise'.

Another important verb of this type is voida (to be able/allowed to).

The stem is formed by removing da with no vowel doubling in the third person singular: juon, juot, juo, juomme, juotte, juovat.

=== Imperfect indicative ===
For these verbs whose stems end in two vowels, the first of the vowels is lost when the i is added in the imperfect: juon = 'I drink', join = 'I drank'.

There is an exception to the rule if the stem already ends in an i (voida or the -oida verbs mentioned earlier). In this case, the stem does not change between present and imperfect indicative, so the imperfect forms are the same as the present forms, and the distinction between them must be made from context.

=== Passive ===
Passives are formed in the same way:

- syödä $\rightarrow$ syödään, syötiin, syötäisiin
- juoda $\rightarrow$ juodaan, juotiin, juotaisiin

== Type III verbs ==
These verbs have a first infinitive ending in two consonants + a: mennä (to go). Another way of describing these verbs is that they have verb stems ending in a consonant to which a vowel must be added (e for the present tense or i for the past tense) before the personal ending. The final consonant of the stem is generally emphasised by length in the infinitive and participle forms and so is written as a double consonant. If the consonant ending of the stem is -s, however, the dictionary form of the verb ends with -stä or -sta. It is another large group of verbs.

=== Present indicative ===
The stem is formed by removing the a and its preceding consonant, and e followed is added, followed by the personal endings: menen, menet, menee, menemme, menette, menevät.

=== Imperfect indicative ===
The i of the imperfect is added directly to the stem formed as for the present tense, and the personal endings are added: pestä = 'to clean', pesen = 'I clean', pesin = 'I cleaned' etc.

=== Passive ===
==== Present passive ====
The passive has the same -aan ending as for group I verbs but no t; the easiest way to form the passive is to extend the vowel on the end of the first infinitive and then add n:

- mennä $\rightarrow$ mennään

==== Other forms ====
All other forms of the passive are related to the present passive in the same way as for type I verbs, including the 'extra t', except that, since there was no t to start with, the passive forms have only one. Also, the double consonant before the ending becomes single.

- mennä $\rightarrow$ mennään $\rightarrow$ mentiin, mentäisiin
- olla $\rightarrow$ ollaan $\rightarrow$ oltiin (see below), oltaisiin

=== Olla (to be) ===
Strictly speaking, olla belongs to this group. 'To be' is irregular in most languages, and Finnish is no exception, but the irregularities are confined to the 3rd-person forms of the present tense and to all person forms in the active potential mood – everything else is regular.

Indicative present:

- olen = I am
- olet = you are
- on = he/she/it is (irregular)
- olemme =we are
- olette = you are
- ovat = they are (irregular)

Potential:

- lienen = I might be
- lienet = you might be
- lienee (or lie) = he/she/it might be
- lienemme = we might be
- lienette = you might be
- lienevät = they might be

== Type IV verbs ==
Types IV-VI have a first infinitive ending in a vowel and ta/tä. Most commonly, type IV verbs end with ata/ätä, ota/ötä, uta/ytä, but other vowels are possible: tavata = 'to meet', pilkata = 'to mock', vastata = 'to answer', haluta = 'to want', tarjota = 'to offer'.

The stem used in present indicative conjugation is formed by dropping the -ta/-tä suffix from the infinitive form and adding a/ä. In conjugation, the normal personal ending is added; the final vowel is doubled in the third person singular unless the stem already ends in aa/ää:

- halua-n, halua-t, halua-a, halua-mme, halua-tte, halua-vat
- tapaa-n, tapaat, tapaa, tapaa-mme, etc.
- pilkkaa-n, pilkkaa-t, pilkkaa, pilkkaa-mme, etc.
- vastaa-n, vastaa-t, vastaa, vastaa-mme, etc.
- tarjoa-n, tarjoa-t, tarjoa-a, tarjoa-mme, etc.

The consonant in the stem appears in the strong grade.

=== Imperfect indicative ===
The imperfect stem can be obtained from the infinitive by changing the final t to s followed by the usual imperfect marker i; the stem consonant appears in the strong grade: halusi-n = 'I wanted', tapasi-t = 'you met', vastasi, 'he answered', etc.

=== Passive ===
Passives in this type are formed in the same fashion as for type I verbs; as in type I, the stem consonant appears in the weak grade:

- haluta $\rightarrow$ halutaan, haluttiin, haluttaisiin
- tavata $\rightarrow$ tavataan, tavattiin, tavattaisiin
- vastata $\rightarrow$ vastataan, vastattu, vastattiin

== Type V verbs ==
All these verbs have infinitives ending in ita/itä. There are few members, but tarvita (to need) is a common example.

The indicative stem may be obtained by dropping the final a and adding -se: tarvitsen, tarvitset, tarvitsee, tarvitsemme, tarvitsette, tarvitsevat.

=== Imperfect indicative ===
-si takes the place of -se, but in the third-person singular, there is only one vowel: tarvitsin, tarvitsit, tarvitsi, tarvitsimme, tarvitsitte, tarvitsivat.

=== Passive ===
The passive forms of these verbs are built just like those of type IV; both types end in -ta.

- valita $\rightarrow$ valitaan, valittiin, valittaisiin
- merkitä $\rightarrow$ merkitään, merkittiin, merkittäisiin

== Type VI verbs ==
Almost all of these verbs have infinitives ending in eta (notable exceptions are parata = (to improve/become better) and huonota = (to deteriorate/become worse). There are not many verbs in this category, and they tend to be uncommon. However, it is a fairly common route for turning adjectives into verbs: kylmä = 'cold', kylmetä = 'to get cold'.

The present stem is characterized by the insertion of ne after the infinitive stem and so the final syllable of the stem is open, and hence the final consonant of the stem is in strong grade:

- rohje-ta = to dare
  - rohkenen = I dare
  - rohkenet = you dare
  - rohkenee = he/she/it dares
- pae-ta = to escape, pakenen = I escape
- kylme-tä = to get cold, kylmenen = I get cold
- para-ta = to improve (intransitive), paranen = I improve

=== Imperfect indicative ===
The imperfect indicative is formed by replacing the final "e" of the "ne" stem with the imperfect marker "i":

- rohkenin = I dared
- rohkenit = you dared
- rohkeni = he/she/it dared etc.

=== Passive ===
Passives are formed in the same way as for type IV verbs.

== Nonderivable and irregular stems ==
Standard Finnish has comparatively very few irregular verbs in addition to olla discussed above. However, because the infinitive is an inflected form of the root, the consonant gradation may obscure the root. The root of the word juosta (to run) is juoks-; when generating the infinitive, the pattern ks → s is applied: juoks+ta → juosta. The epenthetic 'e' is added for personal forms: juoksen.

The verb käydä (to go) is the only verb with y → v variation (käydä → kävin), and thus could be considered irregular.

There is a rare pattern with a stem with -k-, rendered as -hdä in the infinitive, but disappearing in gradation:

- tehdä (to do, make): tee-; teen, teet, tekee, teemme, teette, tekevät, etc.
- nähdä (to see): näe-; näen, näet, näkee, näemme, näette, näkevät, etc.

Teke- and näke- forms are rendered as tehdä and nähdä in the infinitive, but are subject to gradation of 'k' in personal forms, such as teen. In some colloquial forms, the 'e' is rendered as a chroneme instead: nään instead of näen, etc.

Spoken Finnish adds some more irregular verbs by assimilative deletion:

- tulla – tule – tuu
- mennä – mene – mee
- panna – pane – paa
- olla – ole – oo

== Computer programs for inflection and syntax of Finnish verbs ==
- Tuuli { broken | 2021-07-28 }
- Verbix: conjugation of Finnish verbs
