= Livonian grammar =

Grammar of the Livonian language

Livonian is a Finnic language, and, as such, is closely related to both Estonian and Finnish.

== Tones ==
Livonian is a pitch accent language. It has a broken tone that can appear in words. The broken tone is marked with an apostrophe.

lēḑ ‘sphere’	lē’ḑ ‘leaf’
nīņ ‘bark strip’	nī’ņ ‘wide belt’
mō ‘earth’	mō’ ‘down; earthwards’
ūdõ ‘to fry’	ū’dõ ‘to strain’
pūstõ ‘tree (elat. sg.)’	pū’stõ ‘to clean’

== Pronouns ==
=== Personal Pronouns ===
Singular
	First Person ("I")	Second Person ("You")	Third Person ("He" or "She")
Nominative	minā/ma	sinā/sa	tämā/ta
Genitive	min	sin	täm
Dative	minnõn/min	sinnõn/sin	tämmõn/täm
Partitive	mīnda	sīnda	tǟnda
Instrumental	minkõks	sinkõks	tämkõks
Illative	minnõ/minnõz	sinnõ/sinnõz	tämmõ/tämmõz
Inessive	minsõ	sinsõ	tämsõ
Elative	minstõ	sinstõ	tämstõ

Plural
	First Person ("We")	Second Person ("You")	Third Person ("They")
Nominative	mēg/meg	tēg/teg	nämād/ne
Genitive	mäd	täd	nänt
Dative	mäddõn/män	täddõn/tän	näntõn/nän
Partitive	mēḑi	tēḑi	nēḑi
Instrumental	mädkõks	tädkõks	näntkõks
Illative	mēži	tēži	nēži
Inessive	mēši	tēši	nēši
Elative	mēšti	tēšti	nēšti

Note: the third person pronouns do not possess a gender in the singular or the plural.

=== Demonstrative Pronouns ===
	Singular ("this, this one")	Plural ("these, these ones")
Nominative	se	ne
Genitive	sīe	nänt
Dative	sīen	näntõn
Partitive	sīeda	nēḑi
Instrumental	sīekõks	näntkõks
Illative	siezõ	nēži
Inessive	siesõ	nēši
Elative	siestõ	nēšti

Note: The plural demonstrative pronoun is the same as the third person plural personal pronoun.

=== Reflexive Pronouns ===
	Singular ("myself, yourself, oneself")	Plural ("ourselves, yourself/ves, themselves")
Nominative	iž	eņtšõd
Genitive	eņtš	eņtšõd
Dative	eņtšõn	eņtšõn
Partitive	ēņtšta	eņtšidi
Instrumental	eņtšõks	eņtšõdõks
Illative	eņtšõ(z)	eņtšiz
Inessive	eņtšõs	eņtšis
Elative	eņtšõst	eņtšist

Note: The usage of the reflexive pronoun is broad. Of course, it is used as a reflexive pronoun as in "minnõn eņtšõn um vajag...," meaning "I need..." [lit: to myself is necessary...]. However, the pronoun can also express possession; it frequently replaces the genitive forms of the personal pronouns, where it expresses "their own". For example: "ma sīeda kūliz eņtš izast", or "I heard it from my father." Also, reflexive pronouns can be used in adverbial expressions: "täm eņtš ie", "this same night".

== Cases ==
The following are the cases in Livonian:

Case	Singular	Plural
Nominative	-∅	-t -d -õd
Genitive	-∅	-t -d -õd
Partitive	-tā -dā -ța -ta -da -tõ -dõ -õ -∅	-ți -ḑi -ti -di -i
Dative	-n -õn	-ddõn -dõn -tõn -õdõn
Instrumental	-kõks -ks -õks	-dkõks -tkõks -dõks -tõks
Translative	-ks	
Illative	-zõ -(õ)z	-ži -īž -iž -ž -īz -iz
Inessive	-š(õ) -s(õ) -õs(õ)	-ši -īs -is
Elative	-št(õ) -st(õ) -õst(õ)	-šti -īst -ist
Instructive		-īņ -iņ
Allative	-l(õ) -õl	-il -iļ
Adessive	-l(õ) -õl	-il -iļ
Ablative	-ld(õ(st)) -õld	-iļd
Abessive	-tõ	
Lative	-j -jõ	
Essive	-nõ -n	
Exessive	-ndõ(st)	

=== Examples ===
līvli "Livonian"
	Singular		Plural	
Nominative	līvli	-	līvlizt	-t
Genitive	līvliz	-	līvlizt	-t
Partitive	līvliztõ	-tõ	līvliži	-i
Dative	līvlizõn	-õn	līvliztõn	-tõn
Instrumental	līvlizõks	-õks	līvliztõks	-tõks
Illative	līvlizõ	-õ	līvližiz	-iz
Inessive	līvlizõs	-õs	līvližis	-is
Elative	līvlizõst	-õst	līvližist	-ist

ve’ž "water"
	Singular		Plural	
Nominative	ve’ž	-	viedūd	-d
Genitive	vie’d	-	viedūd	-d
Partitive	vietā	-tā	vežži	-i
Dative	vie’ddõn	-õn	viedūdõn	-dõn
Instrumental	vie’dkõks	-kõks	viedūdõks	-dõks
Illative	vie’ddõ	-õ	vežīz	-īz
Inessive	vie’dsõ	-sõ	vežīs	-īs
Elative	vie’dstõ	-stõ	vežīst	-īst

== Moods ==
The following are the moods in Livonian:

Mood and Tense	Person	Singular	Plural
Indicative (present tense)	1	-b -õb —	-mõ -m -õm
	2	-d -õd	-tõ -t -õt
	3	-b -õb —	-bõd -õbõd -āt(õ)
Indicative (past tense)	1	-, (comma indicates palatalization of final consonant) -i -īz -iz -ž -kš	-,mõ -imõ -īzmõ -izmõ -žmõ -kšmõ
	2	-,d -id -īzt -izt -žt -št	-,t(õ) -it(õ) -īzt(õ) -izt(õ) -žt(õ) -kšt(õ)
	3	-, -id -īz -iz -ž -kš	-,t(õ) -it(õ) -īzt(õ) -izt(õ) -žt(õ) -kšt(õ)
Conditional	1	-ks -õks	-kstõ -õkstõ
	2	-kst -õkst	-kstõ -õkstõ
		-ks -õks	-kstõ -õkstõ
Jussive	1		-gõm -õgõm -kkõm -kõm
	2	–	-gīd -gid -õgid -kkõd -kõd
Quotative	1–3	-i -ji -iji	-id -jid -ijid
Jussive	1–3	-gõ -g |-õg -kkõ -kõ	-gõd -õgõd -kkõd -kõd

== Bibliography ==
- Sivers, Fanny de (2000). Parlons live : une langue de la Baltique (in French). Paris: L'Harmattan. ISBN 2-7475-1337-8.
