= Evenki grammar =

This article outlines the grammar of the Evenki language spoken in Russia, in both Cyrillic and Latin scripts. Since the Cyrillic script does not usually mark long vowels, macrons will be used in this article (excepting е (ē), which is always long, at least in native words). Example sentences will be taken from either the Evengus (Russian: Эвенгус) website, or from Nadezhda Bulatova and Lenore Grenoble's book Evenki Grammar in 1997.

== Morphology notes ==
=== Vowel harmony ===
Like other Tungusic languages, Evenki employs vowel harmony. There are two rows ("first and second row") with two neutral vowels, и (i) and у (u). For simplicity, archiphonemes will be used for alternating vowels in suffixes, with capital О (O) for а/э/о (a/ə/o), А (A) for а/э (a/ə), and their iotated counterparts Ё (JO) for я/е/ё (ja/jə/jo), Я (JA) for я/е (ja/jə).

First row	Neutral	Second row
а a	и i	э ə
е e	у u
о o

Syllables containing first row vowels can only be followed by another syllables that contain first row vowels, and vice versa.
- анактадяран (anaktaʒaran)
- эмэктэдерэн (əməktəʒərən)
и (i) and у (u) can be followed by either first or second row vowels.
- сулакива (sulakiva), ACC of сулаки (sulaki).
- улукивэ (ulukivə), ACC of улуки (uluki).
Short о (o) can be followed by о (o); however, о (o) cannot follow long о̄ (ō) or being intervened by neutral vowels. In this place, а (a) is used instead.
- соӈоктодёрон (soŋoktoʒoron)
- о̄дяран (ōʒaran), not *о̄дёрон (*ōʒoron).
- орондивар (oronʒivar), not *орондивор (*oronʒivor).

== Nominals ==
=== Pluralization ===
Here are some rules of forming Evenki plurals:

The plural suffixes -л (-l) after vowels or -ил (-il) after consonants are usually used.
- бур (bur) : бурил (buril) "islands"
- дю̄ (ʒū) : дю̄л (ʒul) "yurts"
However, after -н (-n), -р (-r) is used instead and the final consonant before the suffix is removed.
- орон (oron) : орор (oror) "deers"
Some nouns use -сал (-sal) in addition to the previous two suffixes. Notice that this suffix also removes -н (-n) from the stem.
- киран (kiran) : кирасал (kirasal) "eagles"
Some kinship terms are irregularly pluralized:
- амын (amin) : амтыл (amtil) "fathers"
- эмын (əmin) : эмтыл (əmtil) "mothers"
- акин (akin) : акнил (aknil) "older brothers"
- экин (əkin) : экнил (əknil) "older sisters"
- нэкун (nəkun) : нэкнил (nəknil) "younger brothers, younger sisters"
- аса (asa) : асил (asil) "women"
- хунаг (hunag) : хунил (hunil) "girls"

=== Grammatical cases ===
Evenki nouns are inflected for 13 grammatical cases: nominative, accusative, accusative indefinite, dative, allative, locative, prolative (longitudinal), allative locative, allative prolative, ablative, elative, instrumental, and comitative cases.

List
Case	Suffix			
Case	-V (Note: after vowels)	-C[+V] (Note: after voiced consonants, i.e. any other consonant)	-N (Note: after nasal consonants (м (m), н (n), and ӈ (ŋ))	-C[-V] (Note: after voiceless consonants (к (k), п (p), с (s), т (t), and ч (č)))
Nominative	-∅ (no marker) -∅			
Accusative (Note: According to Bulatova and Grenoble, plurals use -ба/-бэ/-бо (-ba/-bə/-bo), although the Evengus website restricts it dialectally.)	-вО -vO		-мО -mO	-пО -pO
Accusative indefinite (Note: Nouns in -н (-n) and plurals use -О (-a/-ə/-o) (орон (oron) → ороно (orono) "deer".)	-Ё -JO			
Dative	-дӯ -dū			-тӯ -tū
Allative	-ткӣ -tkī	-тыкӣ -tikī		
Locative	-лО̄ -lŌ	-дулА̄ -dulĀ		-тулА̄ -tulĀ
Prolative	-лӣ -lī	-дулӣ -dulī		-тулӣ -tulī
Allative locative	-клО̄ -klŌ	-иклО̄ -iklŌ		
Allative prolative	-клӣ -klī	-иклӣ -iklī		
Ablative	-дук -duk			-тук -tuk
Elative	-гӣт -gīt		-ӈӣт -ŋīt	-кӣт -kīt
Instrumental (Note: -ди (-ʒi) in the plural.)	-т -t	-ит -it	-ди -ʒi	-ит -it
Comitative	-нӯн -nūn			

=== Possession ===
Evenki nouns can also be inflected for possession, where a possessive suffix is attached to the noun based on features of the noun which possesses it.
- 1SG: оронмӣ (oron·mī) "my deer"
- 2SG: ороннӣ (oron·nī) "your deer"
- 3SG: оронин (oron·in) "his/her/its deer"
When declined in grammatical cases, case suffixes are placed between the noun and the possessive suffixes:
- NOM: оронмӣ (oron·∅·mī)
- ACC: оронмов (oron·mo·v)
- ACC.INDEF: оронов (oron·o·v)
There are also reflexive-possessive suffixes; they do not inflect in the nominative, and instead use null on the accusative:
- ACC: оронмӣ (oron·∅·mī)
- ACC.INDEF: орономӣ (oron·o·mī).

Бӣ хунатпӣ ичэм
1SG daughter-REFL see-1sg.PRES
"I see my daughter."

Some kinship nouns, as well as body part names (usually), are inalienable:
- аминмӣ (aminmī) "my father", but амин (amin) "father" can't stand alone
-ӈӣ (-ŋī) is used to mark non-attributive possessive:
- оронӈӣ (oron·∅·ŋī)
To negate presence of an object, а̄чин (āčin) is used:

Миндӯ ӈинакин а̄чин.
1SG-DAT dog NEG.
I don't have a dog.

Дю̄дӯвӣ энинмӣ а̄чин.
house-DAT-REFL mother-1SG NEG.
My mother is not at her home.

Final element in the stem →			Singular				Plural	
Person ↓			-V	-C[+V]	-C[-V]	-n	-l	-r
Singular	1st person		-в -v	-ив -iv		-мӣ -mī	-вӣ -vī	
Singular	2nd person		-с -s	-ис -is		-нӣ -nī	-лӣ -lī	-рӣ -rī
Singular	3rd person		-н -n	-ин -in				
Singular	reflexive		-вӣ -vī		-пӣ -pī	-мӣ -mī	-вӣ -vī	
Plural	1st person	exclusive	-вун -vun			-мун -mun	-вун -vun	
Plural	1st person	inclusive	-т -t	-ит -it		-ты -ty		
Plural	2nd person		-сун -sun			-нун -nun	-лун -lun	-рун -run
Plural	3rd person		-тын -tyn					
Plural	reflexive		-вОр -vOr		-пОр -pOr	-мОр -mOr	-вОр -vOr	

=== Adjectives ===
Evenki adjectives can be declined, and agree with the noun's inflection:
- NOM: хулама о̄сикта (xulama osikta) "red star"
- ACC: хуламава о̄сиктава (xulama·va ōsikta·va)
To create comparative degree forms, -дымАр (-dimAr) after consonants and -тмОр (-tmOr) after vowels are used:
- хэгдытмэр (xəgdi·tmər) "taller"
- ӈонимдымар (ŋonim·dimar) "longer"
To create superlative degree forms, -дыгӯ (-digū) after consonants and -ткӯ (-tkū) after vowels are used:
- хэгдыткӯ (xəgdi·tkū) "tallest"
- ӈонимдыгӯ (ŋonim·digū) "longest"

=== Pronouns ===
Unlike other nominals, personal pronouns in Evenki have significantly irregular inflection:

	1st person			2nd person		3rd person	
	Singular	Plural		Singular	Plural	Singular	Plural
	Singular	Exclusive	Inclusive	Singular	Plural	Singular	Plural
Nominative	бӣ bī	бӯ bū	мит mit	сӣ sī	сӯ sū	нуӈан nuŋan	нуӈартын nuŋartin
Accusative	минэ(вэ) minə(və)	мунэ(вэ) munə(və)	митпэ mitpə	синэ(вэ) sinə(və)	сунэ(вэ) sunə(və)	нуӈанма̄н nuŋanmān	нуӈарватын nuŋarvatin
Dative	миндӯ mindū	мундӯ mundū	миттӯ mittū	синдӯ sindū	сундӯ sundū	нуӈандӯн nuŋandūn	нуӈардӯтын nuŋardūtin
Allative	минтыкӣ mintikī	мунтыкӣ muntikī	миттыкӣ mittikī	синтыкӣ sintikī	сунтыкӣ suntikī	нуӈантыкӣн nuŋantikīn	нуӈартыкӣтын nuŋartikītin
Locative	миндулэ̄ mindulə̄	мундулэ̄ mundulə̄	миттулэ̄ mittulə̄	синдулэ̄ sindulə̄	сундулэ̄ sundulə̄	нуӈандулэ̄н nuŋandulə̄n	нуӈардулэ̄тын nuŋardulə̄tin
Prolative	миндулӣ mindulī	мундулӣ mundulī	миттулӣ mittulī	синдулӣ sindulī	сундулӣ sundulī	нуӈандулӣн nuŋandulīn	нуӈардулӣтын nuŋardulītin
Allative locative	миныклэ̄ miniklə̄	муныклэ̄ muniklə̄	митыклэ̄ mitiklə̄	синыклэ̄ siniklə̄	суныклэ̄ suniklə̄	нуӈаныклэ̄н nuŋaniklə̄n	нуӈарыклэ̄тын nuŋariklə̄tin
Allative prolative	миныклӣ miniklī	муныклӣ muniklī	митыклӣ mitiklī	синыклӣ siniklī	суныклӣ suniklī	нуӈаныклӣн nuŋaniklīn	нуӈарыклӣтын nuŋariklītin
Ablative	миндук minduk	мундук munduk	миттук mittuk	синдук sinduk	сундук sunduk	нуӈандукин nuŋandukin	нуӈардуктын nuŋarduktin
Elative (Note: These forms are not listed by Evengus.)	минӈит minŋit	мунӈит munŋit	миткит mitkit	синӈит sinŋit	сунӈит sunŋit	нуӈанӈидын nuŋanŋidin	нуӈаргидитын nuŋargiʒitin
Instrumental	минди minʒi	мунди munʒi	митит mitit	синди sinʒi	сунди sunʒi	нуӈандын nuŋanʒin	нуӈардитын nuŋarʒitin
Comitative	миннӯн minnūn	муннӯн munnūn	митнӯн mitnūn	синнӯн sinnūn	суннӯн sunnūn	нуӈаннӯнын nuŋannūnin	нуӈарнӯнтын nuŋarnūntin

There are three types of reflexive pronouns in Evenki.

(Impersonal) reflexive pronouns can be inflected into number and cases.	мэ̄нмӣ (mə̄nmī) : мэ̄рвэр (mə̄rvər)
Details differ regarding declension of these pronouns. Bulatova and Grenoble implied that the ending -мӣ (-mī) remains unchanged, while Evengus has the ending changed into -вӣ (-vī). Both agree that case endings are placed between the stem and the ending.	мэ̄ндӯмӣ (mə̄n·dū·mī) v. мэ̄ндӯвӣ (mə̄n·dū·vī)

	Singular	Plural
Accusative	мэ̄нмӣ mə̄nmī	мэ̄рвэр mə̄rvər
Dative	мэ̄ндӯвӣ mə̄ndūvī	мэ̄рдӯвэр mə̄rdūvər
Allative	мэ̄нтыкӣвӣ mə̄ntikīvī	мэ̄ртыкӣвэр mə̄rtikīvər
Locative	мэ̄ндулэ̄вӣ mə̄ndulə̄vī	мэ̄рдулэ̄вэр mə̄rdulə̄vər
Prolative	мэ̄ндулӣвӣ mə̄ndulīvī	мэ̄рдулӣвэр mə̄rdulīvər
Allative locative	мэ̄ныклэ̄вӣ mə̄niklə̄vī	мэ̄риклэ̄вэр mə̄riklə̄vər
Allative prolative	мэ̄ныклӣвӣ mə̄niklīvī	мэ̄риклӣвэр mə̄riklīvər
Ablative	мэ̄ндуквӣ mə̄ndukvī	мэ̄рдуквэр mə̄rdukvər
Instrumental	мэ̄ндивӣ mə̄nʒivī	мэ̄рдивэр mə̄rʒivər
Comitative	мэ̄ннӯнмӣ mə̄nnūnmī	мэ̄рнӯнмэр mə̄rnūnmər

== Citations ==
- Bulatova, Nadezhda; Grenoble, Lenore (1999). Evenki Grammar (PDF). München: Lincom Europa.
