= Finnish numerals =

Name of numbers in Finnish

Numbers in Finnish are highly systematic, but can be irregular.

== Cardinal numbers ==
The ordinary counting numbers (cardinals) from 0 to 12 are given in the table below. Cardinal numbers may be inflected and some of the inflected forms are irregular in form.

The dialectic-colloquial forms may leave the d off and sometimes also the final n: yhden ⇒ yhe(n); kahden ⇒ kahe(n); viiden ⇒ viie(n); kuuden ⇒ kuue(n); kahdeksan ⇒ kaheksa(n); yhdeksän ⇒ yheksä(n).

Cardinal numbers and key inflected forms
Number	Nominative	Colloquial Nominative	Counting	Genitive	Partitive	Illative
0	nolla	nolla	nolla	nollan	nollaa	nollaan
1	yksi	yks	yy (yks)	yhden	yhtä	yhteen
2	kaksi	kaks	kaa (kaks)	kahden	kahta	kahteen
3	kolme	kolme	koo (kol)	kolmen	kolmea	kolmeen
4	neljä	neljä	nee (nel)	neljän	neljää	neljään
5	viisi	viis	vii (viis)	viiden	viittä	viiteen
6	kuusi	kuus	kuu (kuus)	kuuden	kuutta	kuuteen
7	seitsemän	seittemä(n)	see (seiska)	seitsemän	seitsemää (Note: sometimes seitsentä (alternative form))	seitsemään
8	kahdeksan	kaheksa(n)	kasi	kahdeksan	kahdeksaa	kahdeksaan
9	yhdeksän	yheksä(n)	ysi	yhdeksän	yhdeksää	yhdeksään
10	kymmenen	kymmene(n)	kymppi	kymmenen	kymmentä	kymmeneen
11	yksitoista	ykstoist(a)	yytoo (ykstoist(a))	yhdentoista	yhtätoista	yhteentoista
12	kaksitoista	kakstoist(a)	kaatoo (kakstoist(a))	kahdentoista	kahtatoista	kahteentoista

=== Teens and multiples of ten ===
To form teens, toista is added to the base number. Toista is the partitive form of toinen, meaning "second group of ten". Hyphens are written here to separate numerals. In Finnish text, hyphens are not written.

- yksi-toista, kaksi-toista, … yhdeksän-toista

one-second.part, two-second.part, … nine-second.part
"one of the second, two of the second, … nine of the second"
11, 12, … 19

In older Finnish, all numbers were constructed like this. This usage is now considered archaic and the suffix toista is treated as a particle instead of meaning "of the second".

- kaksi-kymmentä, yksi-kolmatta, kaksi-kolmatta, … yhdeksän-kolmatta

two-ten.part, one-third.part, two-third.part, … nine-third.part
"two tens, one of the third, two of the third, … nine of the third"
20, 21, 22, … 29

- yksi-neljättä, yksi-viidettä

one-fourth.part, one-fifth.part
"one of the fourth, one of the fifth"
31, 41

Even older forms included kymmentä at the end, giving for example yksi-toista-kymmentä "one of the second decade" for 11 and viisi-kolmatta-kymmentä "five of the third decade" for 25.

The numbers for tens (20, 30, up to 90) are constructed this way:

- kaksi-kymmentä, kolme-kymmentä, neljä-kymmentä, … yhdeksän-kymmentä

two-ten.part, three-ten.part, four-ten.part, … nine-ten.part
"two tens, three tens, four tens, … nine tens"
20, 30, 40, 90

In modern Finnish, the numbers 21–29, 31–39, and so on are constructed as in English:

- kaksi-kymmentä yksi, kaksi-kymmentä kaksi, kaksi-kymmentä kolme

two-ten.part one, two-ten.part two, two-ten.part three
"two tens one, two tens two, two tens three"
21, 22, 23

=== Hundreds ===
100 is sata, 200 is kaksisataa and so on.

1000 is tuhat, 2000 is kaksituhatta and so on.

So, 3721 is kolme-tuhatta-seitsemän-sataa-kaksi-kymmentä-yksi (actually written as one long word with no dashes in between).

=== Years ===
In older Finnish, years were expressed by counting centuries. Use of this convention is archaic. For instance, yhdeksäntoistasataa kaksikymmentäkaksi "1922", instead of the modern tuhatyhdeksänsataa kaksikymmentäkaksi.

Long numbers (like 32534756) are separated in three-digit sections with spaces beginning from the end of the number (for example 32 534 756). Writing it with letters follows the same spacing, with one additional rule: in numbers over one million, miljoona "million" is written separately. The preceding example is written kolme-kymmentä-kaksi miljoonaa viisi-sataa-kolme-kymmentä-neljä-tuhatta seitsemän-sataa-viisi-kymmentä-kuusi. (No dashes. They are only to make the number look clear.)

=== Inflection ===
Numbers can be inflected by case; all parts of the number except toista are inflected.

Nouns following a number in the nominative singular are usually in the singular partitive case, if the noun does not need to be in any other case and if the number is any number other than yksi "one".

If the number is yksi "one" and it is in the nominative singular then the noun and any adjectives following it will also be in the singular nominative.

But if the noun is in a case besides the nominative, the number and any adjectives following it will be in the same case. For example:

Finnish	English
yksi päivä	one day
kaksi päivää	two days
kahtena päivänä	on/during two days
kahdessatoista maassa	in twelve countries
kolmellekymmenelleviidelle hengelle	for thirty-five persons

=== Sets ===
Numerals also have plural forms, which usually refer to things naturally occurring in pairs or other similarly well-defined sets, such as body parts and clothing items. Also names of celebrations are usually in the plural. The plural forms are inflected in cases in the same way as the corresponding nouns. For instance:

Finnish	English
kahdet saappaat	two pairs of boots
kolmissa jalanjäljissä	in three sets of footprints
Neljät häät ja yhdet hautajaiset	Four Weddings and a (One) Funeral

=== Etymology ===
Numbers from one to seven are apparently original in etymology. The words kahdeksan "eight" and yhdeksän "nine" have no confirmed etymology. The old theory is that they are compounds: *kaks-teksa "10–2", or "eight" and *yks-teksa "10–1", or "nine", where the reconstructed word *teksa is similar to the Indo-European words for "ten" (*dek´m), but this is phonologically not plausible. Alternatively, they could be *kakt-e-ksä and ykt-e-ksä "itself, without two" and "without one", where -eksa is a form of ei "no" inflected with the Karelian reflexive conjugation ("itself, without two").

== Ordinal numbers ==
These are the 'ordering' form of the numbers: "first, second, third", and so on. Ordinal numbers are generally formed by adding an -s ending, but first and second are completely different, and for the others the stems are not straightforward:

Ordinal numbers 1–10
Finnish	English
ensimmäinen	first
toinen	second
kolmas	third
neljäs	fourth
viides	fifth
kuudes	sixth
seitsemäs	seventh
kahdeksas	eighth
yhdeksäs	ninth
kymmenes	tenth

For teens, the first part of the word is changed; however, the words for "first" and "second" lose their irregularity in "eleven" and "twelve":

Ordinal numbers 11–19
Finnish	English
yhdestoista	eleventh
kahdestoista	twelfth
kolmastoista	thirteenth
neljästoista	fourteenth
viidestoista	fifteenth
kuudestoista	sixteenth
seitsemästoista	seventeenth
kahdeksastoista	eighteenth
yhdeksästoista	nineteenth

For twenty through ninety-nine, all parts of the number get the '-s' ending. 'First' and 'second' take the irregular form only at the end of a word. The regular forms are possible for them but they are less common.

Ordinal numbers 20–23
Finnish	English
kahdeskymmenes	twentieth
kahdeskymmenesensimmäinen (Note: Also kahdeskymmenesyhdes)	twenty-first
kahdeskymmenestoinen (Note: Also kahdeskymmeneskahdes)	twenty-second
kahdeskymmeneskolmas	twenty-third
Notes

100th is sadas, 1000th is tuhannes, 3721st is kolmas-tuhannes-seitsemäs-sadas-kahdes-kymmenes-ensimmäinen. Again, dashes only included here for clarity; the word is properly spelled without them.

Like cardinals, ordinal numbers can also be inflected:

Finnish	English
kolmatta viikkoa	for (already) the third week
viidennessätoista kerroksessa	in the fifteenth floor
tuhannennelle asiakkaalle	to the thousandth customer

The toista in the 'teens' is actually the partitive of toinen, which is why toista gets no further inflection endings. (Literally yksitoista || one-of-the-second'.)

Long ordinal numbers in Finnish are typed in almost the same way as the long cardinal numbers. 32534756 would be (in numbers over one million, miljoona "million" is written separately) kolmas-kymmenes-kahdes miljoonas viides-sadas-kolmas-kymmenes-neljäs-tuhannes seitsemäs-sadas-viides-kymmenes-kuudes. (Still, no dashes.)

== Names of numbers ==
This is a feature of Finnish which does not have an exact counterpart in English (with the curious exceptions of calling a five-dollar bill a fiver and 9 niner in radio communication), but there is a counterpart in colloquial German, for example: 7er, 190er, 205er. These forms are used to refer to the actual number itself, rather than the quantity or order which the number represents. This should be clearer from the examples below, but first here is the list:

Names of numbers
Finnish	English
nolla	nil, number zero
ykkönen	the number one the figure "1"
kakkonen	2
kolmonen	3
nelonen	4
viitonen	5
kuutonen	6
seitsemän seitsemäinen seitsikko seiska (colloquial)	7
kahdeksan kahdeksikko kasi (colloquial)	8
yhdeksän yhdeksikkö ysi (colloquial)	9
kymmenen kymppi (colloquial)	number ten

Also, kahdeksikko refers to the shape of the number. Some examples of how these are used:

The 'number three tram' is the kolmonen — when you are riding it, you are riding with kolmosella
A magazine has the title 7 and is called Seiska
My car, a '93 model, is an ysikolmonen when buying spare parts
If the car is a 190E Mercedes, it would be a sataysikymppi.
If a car has tires in size of 205, they would be called kaks(i)-sataa-viitoset (impl. a set of-)"two hundred fives" or kaks(i)-sataa-viitosia (impl. a number of-)"two hundred fives". Also kaks(i)-nolla-viitoset (impl. a set of-)"two zero fives" or kaks(i)-nolla-viitosia (impl. a number of-)"two zero fives". (Note: Hyphenation is for clarity. In Finnish text, hyphens are not written)
The 106 bus is the sata kuutonen
A 5€ bill may be called viitonen, a 10€ bill kymppi (in plural: kympit/kymppejä), a 20€ kaksikymppinen, a 100€ bill satanen, etc.

== Numbers in the spoken language ==
In spoken Finnish the final i in yksi, kaksi, viisi, kuusi, as well as the final a in the numbers 11-19, is frequently dropped. Other short forms can be heard for the tens, where the element kymmentä can be heard as "kyt": shortened words like kolkyt (30), nelkyt (40), viiskyt (50), kuuskyt (60), seiskyt (70), kaheksakyt (80), yheksäkyt (90) are not uncommon. When counting a list of items a kind of spoken shorthand can be heard. Thus, yksi kaksi kolme neljä viisi... may become yks kaks kol nel viis... or even yy kaa koo nee vii..., but the forms can vary from person to person.
