= Instructive case =

Grammatical case

In grammar, the instructive case is a grammatical case used in Finnish, Estonian, and the Turkic languages.

== Uralic languages ==
In Finnish, the instructive case is used to indicate means, manner, instrument, location, or time. It is almost exclusively used in fixed expressions, such as in omin silmin (lit. 'with one's own eyes'). However, the instructive is productive for infinitive verbal constructions to indicate manner, as in nauraen (lit. 'laughing'): He astuivat nauraen sisään (lit. 'They stepped in through the door laughing').

In modern Finnish, many of its instrumental uses are being superseded by the adessive case, as in minä matkustin junalla (lit. 'I travelled by train').

The instructive case is only marginally present in Estonian in lexicalized expressions. Language reformers of the 20th century did try to revive it, but with little success.

== Turkish ==
In Turkish, the suffix -le is used for this purpose; for example, Trenle geldim (lit. 'I came via train').

== Sources ==
- Anhava, Jaakko (2015). "Criteria For Case Forms in Finnish and Hungarian Grammars". Studia Orientalia Electronica. 108. Helsinki.
- Karlsson, Fred (2018). Finnish - A Comprehensive Grammar. London and New York: Routledge. ISBN 978-1-138-82104-0.
- Metslang, Helle (2017). "10. Can a language be forced? The case of Estonian". In Van Olmen, Daniel; Cuyckens, Hubert; Ghesquière, Lobke (eds.). Aspects of Grammaticalization: (Inter)Subjectification and Directionality. Trends in Linguistics. Studies and Monographs. Vol. 305. De Gruyter Mouton. pp. 281–310. doi:10.1515/9783110492347-011. ISBN 9783110489699. ISSN 1861-4302.
