= Allative case =

Grammatical case

The allative case (/ˈælətɪv/ AL-ə-tiv; abbreviated all; from Latin allāt-, afferre "to bring to") is a type of locative grammatical case. The term allative is generally used for the lative case for the majority of languages that do not make finer distinctions.

== Finnish ==
For the Finnish language (a Uralic language), the allative is the fifth of the locative cases, with the basic meaning of "onto". Its ending is -lle, for example pöytä (table) and pöydälle (onto the top of the table). In addition, it is the logical complement of the adessive case for referring to "being around the place". For example, koululle means "to the vicinity of the school". With time, the use is the same: ruokatunti (lunch break) and ... lähti ruokatunnille ("... left to the lunch break"). Some actions require the case, e.g. kävely - mennä kävelylle "a walk - go for a walk". It also means "to" or "for", for example minä (me) and minulle (to/for me).

The other locative cases in Finnish and Estonian are these:

- Inessive case ("in")
- Elative case ("out of")
- Illative case ("into")
- Adessive case ("at", "in the vicinity of" or "on")
- Ablative case ("away from" or "off of")

== Baltic languages ==
For the Lithuanian and Latvian languages, the allative had been used dialectally as an innovation since Proto-Indo-European, but it is almost out of use in modern times. Its ending in Lithuanian is -op which was shortened from -opi, whereas its ending in Latvian is -up. For the modern languages the remains of the allative can be found in certain fixed expressions that have become adverbs, such as Lithuanian išėjo Dievop ("gone to God", i.e. died), velniop! ("to the devil" i.e. to hell), nuteisti myriop ("sentence to death"), rudeniop ("towards autumn"), vakarop ("towards the evening"), Latvian mājup ("towards home"), kalnup ("uphill"), lejup ("downhill").

== Greek ==
For Mycenaean Greek, an ending -de is used to denote an allative, when it is not being used as an enclitic, e.g. te-qa-de, *Tʰēgʷasde, "to Thebes" (Linear B: 𐀳𐀣𐀆). This ending survives into Ancient Greek in words such as Athḗnaze, from accusative Athḗnās + -de.

== Latin ==
The Latin accusative case is used for motion towards towns and small islands in a manner that is analogous to the allative case.

== Udmurt ==
For the Udmurt language, words inflected with the allative (often termed "approximative" for Permic languages) case ending "-лань" /ɫɑɲ/ express the direction of a movement.

== Hebrew ==
In Biblical Hebrew (more common in Classical Biblical Hebrew than in Late Biblical Hebrew) the "directional he", "locative he" or he locale, in the form of ־ָה /-ɔh/ suffixed to nouns (often place names) also functions as an allative marker, usually translated as 'to' or 'toward'. The directional he appears in later phases of the Hebrew language in expressions such as מעלה (upwards) and הביתה (homeward).

== Wanyi ==
Wanyi, an endangered Australian language, has the allative suffixes -kurru/wurru.
