= Instrumental case =

Grammatical case

In grammar, the instrumental case (abbreviated ins or instr) is a grammatical case used to indicate that a noun is the instrument or means by or with which the subject achieves or accomplishes an action. The noun may be either a physical object or an abstract concept.

== General discussion ==
The instrumental case appears in this Russian sentence:

Я написал письмо пером.
Ya napisal pis'mo perom.
I wrote {(the) letter} {[with] (a) quill pen.}

Here, the inflection of the noun meaning "quill pen" indicates its instrumental role: the nominative перо changes its ending to become пером.

Modern English expresses the instrumental meaning by use of adverbial phrases that begin with the words with, by, or using, followed by the noun indicating the instrument:

I wrote the note with a pen.
I wrote the note (by) using a pen.

Technical descriptions often use the phrase "by means of", which is similar to "by use of", as in:

I wrote the note by means of a pen.
I wrote the note by use of a pen.

This can be replaced by "via", which is a Latin ablative (viā) of the nominative via, meaning road, route, or way. In the ablative it means by way of.

The instrumental case appears in Old English, Old Saxon, Georgian, Armenian, Basque, Sanskrit, and the Balto-Slavic languages. An instrumental/comitative case is arguably present in Turkish as well as in Tamil. Also, Uralic languages reuse the adessive case where available, locative case if not, to mark the same category, or comitative case (Estonian). For example, the Finnish kirjoitan kynällä does not mean "I write on a pen", but "I write using a pen", even if the adessive -llä is used. In Ob-Ugric languages, the same category may also mark agents with verbs that use an ergative alignment, for instance, "I give you, using a pen".

The instrumental case is notably used in Russian, where the case is called творительный падеж (tvoritel'nyj padež) though similar usages also can be found in other Balto-Slavic languages. In most declension paradigms, the instrumental case in Russian can generally be distinguished by the -ом ("-om") suffix for most masculine and neuter nouns, the -ою/-oй ("-oju"/"-oj") suffix for most feminine nouns and -ами ("-ami") for any of the three genders in the plural.

Just as in English the preposition "with" can express instrumental ("using, by means of"), comitative ("in the company of"), and a number of other semantic relations, the instrumental case in Russian is not limited to its instrumental thematic role. It is also used to denote:

- the agent in a passive voice construction. E.g.: "Книга написана Марком Твеном" ("The book was written by Mark Twain"). Here, "Марком Твеном" ("by Mark Twain") is "Марк Твен" ("Mark Twain") in the instrumental case.
- a predicate with infinitive, future tense, imperative, conditional and gerund of the verbs "быть" and "являться" (both meaning 'to be') (for example, "я хочу быть врачом", "не будь трусом" translate as "I want to be a doctor" and "don't be a coward", with the nouns in the instrumental case).
- a predicate with a number of other verbs, denoting state, appearance, manner, consideration, etc.
- parts of the day, seasons of the year, and some other temporal relations. For example, the sentence "я работаю утром" (ja rabotaju utrom) means "I work in the morning". The word утро (utro, "morning") in its instrumental case denotes the time in which the action (in the case of this example, "working") takes place ("in the morning").
- similarity. For example, the phrases "выть волком," "умереть героем," "лететь стрелой" (to howl like a wolf, to die like a hero, to fly like an arrow) use nouns in the instrumental case.
- location, when used with prepositions "behind", "in front of", "under", "above", "next to", and "between"

The Russian instrumental case is also used with verbs of use and control (to own, to manage, to abuse, to rule, to possess, etc.), attitude (to be proud of, to threaten (with), to value, to be interested (in), to admire, to be obsessed (with), etc.), reciprocal action (to share, to exchange), and some other verbs.

Though the instrumental case does not exist in many languages, some languages use other cases to denote the means, or instrument, of an action. In Classical Greek, for example, the dative case is used as the instrumental case. This can be seen in the sentence "..με κτείνει δόλῳ," or "..me ktenei dolôi" (Book IX, line 407 of the Odyssey), which means "he kills me with a bait". Here, "δόλῳ," the dative of "δόλος" ("dolos" – a bait) is used as the instrumental case (the means or instrument here is, obviously, the bait). In Latin the instrumental case has merged with the ablative, thus the ablative case has the same functions. For example, ipso facto can be translated as "by the fact itself", while oculīs vidēre means "to see with one's eyes".

In Modern English, the word why is one instance of an etymologically instrumental declension. Though not commonly known to be of pronominal origin, it was, in fact, inherited from Old English hwȳ, which was the declension of hwæt (now what) in the Old English instrumental case – a grammatical feature rare even in Old English. The modern instrumental case (as present in why) does not bear the meaning of instrument, but of purpose, cause, or reason: rather, the closely related form how is used to express instrument, way, or means. In phrases such as "The more, the merrier", the word the derives from the instrumental case of the demonstrative pronoun related to the modern English word that.

== Indo-European languages ==
Proto-Indo-European has been reconstructed as having eight cases, one of which was the instrumental.

=== Sanskrit ===
The instrumental case in Classical Sanskrit can have several meanings:

- It can indicate the instrument (of an action):

रामो लेखन्या लिखति।
Rāmo lekhanyā likhati.
"Rāma writes with a pen."

- It can be used to indicate someone or something accompanying an action. In this case, the sense of "company" is indicated by postpositions like सह saha ("with") (may be optionally omitted):

दासेन सह देवदत्तोऽगच्छत्।
Dāsena saha devadatto'gacchat.
"Devadatta went accompanied by the servant."

- It can indicate the agent of a passive verb:

देवदत्तेन यवं खाद्यते।
Devadattena yavaṁ khādyate.
"Barley is eaten by Devadatta."

- It can indicate the cause, reason or circumstance of an action. In this case, it can be translated as "because of", "out of", etc.:

दुःखेन ग्रामम् अत्यजत्।
duḥkhena grāmam atyajat.
"He abandoned the village out of misery."

- It is used with the preposition विना vinā ("without"):

जलेन विना पद्मं नश्यति।
jalena vinā padmaṁ naśyati.
"A lotus dies without water."

- It can also be used with the particles अलम् alam and कृतम् kṛtam, both meaning "enough".

कृतं कोलाहलेन।
kṛtaṁ kolāhalena.
"Enough with noise."

=== Assamese ===
In Standard Assamese (এ)ৰে (e)re indicates the instrumental case. (এ)দি (e)di does the job in some dialects.

চিমিয়ে কলমেৰে লিখে।
simie kolomere likhe.
"Simi writes with pens/a pen."

আমি হাবিৰে গৈ আছোঁ।
ami habire goi asü.
"We are going through a forest."

বাটিটো মাটিৰে বনোৱা।
batitü matire bonüa.
"The bowl is made of soil."

=== Ancient Greek ===
The functions of the Proto-Indo-European instrumental case were taken over by the dative, so that the Greek dative has functions belonging to the Proto-Indo-European dative, instrumental, and locative. This is the case with the bare dative, and the dative with the preposition σύν sýn "with". It is possible, however, that Mycenean Greek had the instrumental case, which was later replaced by dative in all the Greek dialects, and the instrumental suffix -φι(ν) was still used sometimes in Homeric Greek.

=== Germanic ===
Proto-Germanic inherited the Indo-European instrumental case, but in nouns, the case was almost entirely lost in Gothic, Old Norse and Old Frisian, which indicated the instrumental case with the dative inflection in all but a few relic forms. Early Old High German and Old Saxon nouns do exhibit an instrumental case, for example Old High German wortu 'word' and Old Saxon hoƀu 'court', where the -u ending derives from a Proto-Indo-European instrumental inflection *-ō. In adjectives, no instrumental plural inflection can be reconstructed for Common Germanic, but the early West Germanic dialects did retain a distinctive instrumental singular strong adjective ending. Similarly, in demonstrative and interrogative pronouns, there is no evidence for distinctive instrumental plural inflections, but the West Germanic dialects and, less often, Old Norse and Gothic, retained distinctive instrumental singular forms.

==== Old English ====
The instrumental case is found in certain usages in Old English. It has left a legacy in Modern English, in the words "why" and "thus": 'why' is from hwy, the instrumental case of 'hwa / hwæt' (who / what) and 'thus' apparently from þys, the instrumental case of 'þes / þis' (this).

Adjectives and the demonstrative and interrogative pronouns all have instrumental forms. Adverbs are commonly formed in Old English by adding -e to the adjective, which is the adjective's instrumental case.

In Old English, the instrumental case denotes means or manner, in such phrases as "oþre naman Iulius" ('by other name called Julius') or expressions of time: "þy ilcan dæge"; 'on the same day'. (In these examples, the whole expression is in the instrumental case, but only the oþre or þy is distinctive in form from the dative.)

==== Development into Middle High German ====
In nouns, the Old German instrumental was replaced with the dative in Middle High German, comparable with English and Ancient Greek, with a construction of mit (with) + dative clause (in English, the objective case is used). For example:

"Hans schrieb mit einem Stifte*."
(John [nominative] wrote with a [dative] pencil [dative].)

*the German dative -e is not used in most common conversation; it is only used here for a better demonstration.

- ein = a, nominative case masculine/neuter → einem = a, dative case masculine/neuter
- (der) Stift = (the) pencil, masculine, nominative
- (dem) Stifte = (the) pencil, masculine, dative

=== Czech ===
Just as above, the object with which the action is done or completed is declined. For example:

- Píšu perem.
  - psát = to write; píšu = I write
  - pero = a pen → perem = with a pen
- Jedu do školy autobusem.
  - jet = to go via transport (× jít = to go on foot); jedu = I go (using any kind of vehicle)
  - škola = school, do školy = to school (genitive)
  - autobus = a bus → autobusem = by bus

=== Armenian ===
The instrumental in Armenian is denoted by the -ով (-ov) suffix to say that an action is done by, with or through an agent.

- մատիտ (matit, pencil) → մատիտով (matitov, with/by a pencil)
  - մատիտով գրիր (matitov grir) Write with a pencil.

While the instrumental case is the form most commonly used for this purpose, when coupled with the passive voice in Armenian the instrumental case can be replaced with the ablative case.

=== Serbo-Croatian ===
Use of instrumental case without or with "sa".

Instrumental in the Serbo-Croatian language group is usually used to denote a noun with which the action is done, e.g. "Idem autom" - "I'm going by means of a car", "Jedem vilicom/viljuškom" - "I eat with a fork", "Prenosi se zrakom/vazduhom" - "It's transferred through air", "Prožeta je bijesom" - "She's consumed by anger". The instrumental preposition "s(a)", meaning "with", is supposed to be dropped in this usage, but it is often kept in casual speech when talking about objects in use, such as a pen, a hammer, etc.

Instrumental can also denote company, in which case "s(a)" is mandatory, e.g. "Pričali smo sa svima" - "We talked with everyone", "Došao je s roditeljima" - "He came with his parents", "Šetala se sa psom" - "She was taking a walk with her dog". Dropping "s(a)" in this case would either make the sentences incorrect, or change their meaning entirely because dative, locative and instrumental share the same form in the plural, so the examples "Pričali smo svima" i "Došao je roditeljima" would come to mean "We told everyone" and "He came to his parents".

Instrumental is also used with certain spatial prepositions like "među" (between), "nad" (above), "pod" (underneath), "pred" (in front of) and "za" (after). Note the difference between these prepositions and similar ones used for genitive with an -i suffix: "između", "iznad", "ispod", "ispred" and "iza".

Instrumental is used without proposition to denote travelling through an area: "Putujem zemljom" - "I'm travelling the country", "Hodam plažom" - "I'm walking along a beach", etc.

It can also be used to show how long or when in a larger scope of time something happened: "Nema ih godinama" - "They haven't come in years", "S vremenom će proći" - "It will pass in time", "Jednom tjednom" - "Once a week", etc.

=== Latvian ===
The instrumental case in Latvian declension (one of the three Baltic languages, alongside Lithuanian and Old Prussian) can have several meanings:

- It can indicate the instrument (of an action):

Viņš raksta ar spalvu
"He writes with a pen".

- It can be used to indicate someone or something accompanying an action. In this case, :

Viņa dziedāja ar meitu
"She sang with a girl".

== Uralic ==
=== Hungarian ===
The instrumental case is present in the Hungarian language, where it serves several purposes. The main purpose is the same as the above, i.e. the means with which an action occurs. It has a role in the -(t)at- causative form of verbs, that is, the form of a verb that shows the subject caused someone else to action the verb. In this sense, the instrumental case is used to mark the person that was caused to execute the action expressed by the verb. It is also used to quantify or qualify words such as 'better' or 'ago', such as sokkal jobban 'much better' (literally 'with-much better'); hét évvel ezelőtt 'seven years ago' (literally 'seven with-years before this').

In Hungarian the instrumental and comitative case look the same, see Instrumental-comitative case.

See the links section below for a more detailed article.

=== Finnish ===
Finnish has a historic, marginal instructive case (-n), but in practice the adessive case (-lla/-llä) is used instead outside lexicalised fixed expressions, even though the adessive literally means 'on top', e.g. vasaralla 'using a hammer' (instrumental meaning) or 'on a hammer' (locative meaning). (Vasaroin 'using hammers' is plausible and understandable, but not common in use.)

== Uto-Aztecan ==
=== Nahuatl ===
Nahuatl uses the suffix -tica to indicate the instrumental case. For example, in the sentence ātlān ācaltica in huāllahqueh 'they came on the water by boat', ācalli means 'boat' and ācaltica means 'by (use of a) boat'.

== Turkic ==
=== Turkish ===
Turkish uses the conjunction ile ("with"), and its suffixed form -(y)lA (realised as -(y)la or -(y)le, depending on the dominant vowel of the noun—see vowel harmony) to indicate the instrumental case. For example, in the sentence Arabayla geldi 'he came by (the use of a) car', araba means 'car' and arabayla means 'by (the use of a) car, with a car'.

The original Proto-Turkic instrumental case suffix was -n, which is less productive today but is preserved in common words like yazın ("during the summer"), kışın ("during the winter"), öğlen ("at noon"), and yayan ("by foot", "on foot"). It became less productive in most Oghuz Turkic languages. The conjunction ile ("with") in Turkish has semantically expanded to fill the gap (kürek ile or kürekle, meaning "with the shovel" > "using the shovel"), being used as an instrumental marker, and the suffix -(y)lA (-le, -la, -yle, -yla) is a form of ile which has been grammaticalized into an agglutinative suffix as a result of quick speech, becoming an enclitic.

== Japanese ==
In Japanese, the post-positional particle で de indicates the instrumental case.

刀で 敵を 斬る。
katana-de teki-wo kiru.
katana-INSTR foe-DO slay.NPAST
'(I) slay (my) foe with a katana.'

== Northeast Caucasian ==
=== Vainakh ===
The instrumental in the Vainakh languages of the North Caucasus, comprising Chechen and Ingush, is denoted by the -ца / -аца / -ица (-tsa / -atsa / -itsa) suffix to describe an action which is done with an object:

Аса Бахьамица Кехатт йазздир.
Asa Bahamitsa Kekhatt yazzdir.
"I {with (a) quill pen} {(the) letter} wrote.

The nominative Baham changes its ending to become Bahamitsa:

- Бахьам = pen → Бахьамица = with a pen
  - Бахьамица йазздир (bahamitsa yazzdir) Wrote with a pen.
