= Adessive case =

Grammatical case

An adessive case (abbreviated ade; from Latin adesse "to be present (at)": ad "at" + esse "to be") is a grammatical case generally denoting location at, upon, or adjacent to the referent of the noun; the term is used most frequently for Uralic studies. For Uralic languages, such as Finnish, Estonian and Hungarian, it is the fourth of the locative cases, with the basic meaning of "on"—for example, Estonian laud (table) and laual (on the table), Hungarian asztal and asztalnál (at the table). It is also used as an instrumental case in Finnish.

For Finnish, the suffix is -lla/-llä, e.g. pöytä (table) and pöydällä (on the table). In addition, it can specify "being around the place", as in koululla (at the school including the schoolyard), as contrasted with the inessive koulussa (in the school, inside the building).

In Estonian, the ending -l is added to the genitive case, e.g. laud (table) - laual (on the table). Besides the meaning "on", this case is also used to indicate ownership. For example, "mehel on auto" means "the man owns a car".

As the Uralic languages don't possess the verb "to have", the concept is expressed as a subject in the adessive case + on (for example, minulla on, "I have", literally "at me is").

The other locative cases in Finnish, Estonian, and Hungarian are:

- Inessive case ("in")
- Elative case ("out of")
- Illative case ("into")
- Allative case ("onto")
- Ablative case ("off")
- Superessive case ("on top of, or on the surface of")

== Finnish ==
The Finnish adessive case has the word ending -lla or -llä (according to the rules of vowel harmony). It is usually added to nouns and associated adjectives.

It is used in the following ways.

- Expressing the static state of being on the surface of something.

Possible English meanings of on, on top of, or atop

Kynä on pöydällä - The pen is on the table.

- As an existential clause with the verb olla (to be) to express possession

This is the Finnish way to express the English verb to have

Meillä on koira. = We have a dog. ('on our (possession, responsibility, etc.) is dog')

- Expressing the instrumental use of something

Possible English meanings of with, by or using

Hän meni Helsinkiin junalla. - He went to Helsinki by train.
Hän osti sen eurolla. - He bought it for a Euro.

- In certain time expressions expressing the time at which events occur

Possible English meanings of during, in or over

Aamulla. - In the morning.
Keväällä. - During Spring.

- Expressing the general proximity in space or time at which something occurs (where the more specific proximity case would be the inessive)

Possible English meaning of at

Poikani on koululla - My son is at school.

(cf. inessive case: Poikani on koulussa - My son is inside the school.)

Hän on ruokatunnilla. - He is at lunch. - literally "on the lunch hour".

(This proximity difference corresponds to adverbial forms such as täällä - "around here" and tässä - "right here",

though they are not strictly a use of the adessive case).

== Non-Uralic ==
Other languages which employ an adessive case or case function include archaic varieties of Lithuanian (which likely developed by the influence of Uralic), some Northeast Caucasian languages such as Lezgian and Hunzib, and the Ossetic languages, both ancient and modern.
