= Inessive case =

Grammatical case

In grammar, the inessive case (abbreviated INE; from Latin: inesse "to be in or at") is a locative grammatical case. This case carries the basic meaning of "in": for example, "in the house" is talo·ssa in Finnish, maja·s in Estonian, куд·са (kud·sa) in Moksha, etxea·n in Basque, nam·e in Lithuanian, sāt·ā in Latgalian and ház·ban in Hungarian.

In Finnish the inessive case is typically formed by adding -ssa/-ssä. Estonian adds -s to the genitive stem. In Moksha -са (-sa) is added (in Erzya -со (-so)). In Hungarian, the suffix ban/ben is most commonly used for inessive case, although many others, such as on/en/ön and others are also used, especially with cities.

In the Finnish language, the inessive case is considered the first (in Estonian the second) of the six locative cases, which correspond to locational prepositions in English. The remaining five cases are:

- Elative case ("out of")
- Illative case ("into")
- Allative case ("onto")
- Adessive case ("on")
- Ablative case ("from")

== Finnish ==
The Finnish language inessive uses the suffix -ssa or -ssä (depending on vowel harmony). It is usually added to nouns and associated adjectives.

It is used in the following ways:

- Expressing the static state of being in something.

asumme Suomessa = we live in Finland

- (with time expressions) stating how long something took to be accomplished or done

possible English translations include in, within

kahdessa vuodessa = within 2 years, during 2 years

- when two things are closely connected

English translations can include on in phrases of this type

N.N. puhelimessa = N.N. on the phone
sormus on sormessani = the ring is on my finger

- as an existensial clause with the verb olla (to be), to express possession of objects

sanomalehdessä on 68 sivua = the newspaper has 68 pages

- with the verb käydä, vierailla

minä käyn baarissa = I visit the bar

- There are both singular and plural forms

Käyn baareissa = I visit the bars

=== Dialectal variants ===
In a large part of the southwestern, south Ostrobothnian, southeastern as well as in some Tavastian dialects, the suffix is simply -s (e.g. maas, talos), similarly to Estonian. This is an example of apocope. When coupled with a possessive suffix, the result can be like in standard Finnish "maassani, talossani" or a shorter "maasani, talosani" depending on the dialect: the former is more common in Tavastian and southeastern dialects while the latter is more common in southwestern dialects.

Most central and northern Ostrobothnian dialects as well as some southwestern and Peräpohjola dialects use a shorter suffix -sa/-sä, e.g. maasa, talosa.
