= Elative case =

Grammatical case

In grammar, the elative case (abbreviated ELA; from Latin: efferre "to bring or carry out") is a locative grammatical case signifying that something comes from something, somewhere or someone.

== Usage ==
=== Uralic languages ===
In Finnish, the elative is typically formed by adding sta/stä, in Estonian by adding -st to the genitive stem, -õst in Livonian and -sto in Erzya. In Hungarian, the suffix -ból/-ből expresses the elative:

Finnish: talosta - "out of the house, from the house" (Finnish talo = "house") taloista - "out of the houses, from the houses" (Finnish talot = "houses")
Estonian: majast - "out of the house, from the house" (Estonian maja = "house")
Erzya: kudosto - "out of the house, from the house" (Erzya kudo = "house")
Hungarian: házból - "out of the house" (Hungarian ház = "house")

In some dialects of Finnish it is common to drop the final vowel of the elative ending, which then becomes identical to the elative morpheme of Estonian; for example: talost. This pronunciation is common in southern Finland, appearing in the southwestern dialects and in some Tavastian dialects. Most other dialects use the standard form -sta.

=== Russian ===
In some rare cases the elative still exists in contemporary Russian, though it was used more widely in 17-18th cc. texts: и́з лесу (out of the forest), кровь и́з носу (blood from the nose), из Яросла́влю (from Yaroslavl).

== See also ==
Other locative cases are:

- Inessive case ("in")
- Superessive case ("on")
- Adessive case ("by/at")
- Illative case ("into")
- Sublative case ("onto")
- Allative case ("towards")
- Ablative case ("away from")
- Delative case ("off")
