= Illative case =

Grammatical case used in languages such as Finnish, Lithuanian, and Hungarian

In grammar, the illative case (/ˈɪlətɪv/; abbreviated ill; from Latin: illatus "brought in") is a grammatical case used in the Finnish, Estonian, Lithuanian, Latvian, Hungarian, Sámi and Vepsian languages. It is one of the locative cases, and has the basic meaning of "into (the inside of)". Examples include:

- Hungarian: a házba ('into the house', with a ház meaning 'the house').
- Estonian: majasse and majja ('into the house'), formed from maja ('house').
- Finnish: taloon ('into the house'), formed from talo ('house').
- Erzya: venčes ('into the boat'), formed from venč ('boat').
- Lithuanian: laivan ('into the boat') formed from laivas ('boat').
- Latvian: laivā ('into the boat') formed from laiva ('boat').

== In Finnish ==
The case is formed by adding -hVn, where 'V' represents the last vowel, and then removing the 'h' if a simple long vowel would result. For example, talo + Vn becomes taloon with a simple long 'oo'; cf. maa + hVn becomes maahan, without the elision of 'h'. This unusually complex way of adding a suffix can be explained by its reconstructed origin: a voiced palatal fricative. (Modern Finnish has lost palatalization and fricatives other than 'h' or 's'.) In some dialects spoken in Ostrobothnia, notably South Ostrobothnia, the 'h' is not removed; one says talohon. Some dialects of Finland Proper and Kymenlaakso also have a similar feature. In some instances -seen is added, e.g. huone (room) and Lontoo (London) thus huoneeseen and Lontooseen respectively.

The other locative cases in Finnish, Estonian and Hungarian are:

- Inessive case ("(to be) in")
- Elative case ("out of")
- Adessive case ("(to be) on")
- Allative case ("onto")
- Ablative case ("from, off")

== In Lithuanian ==
The illative case, denoting direction of movement, is now less common in the standard language but is common in the spoken language, especially in certain dialects. Its singular form, heard more often than the plural, appears in books, newspapers, etc. Most Lithuanian nouns can take the illative ending, indicating that from the descriptive point of view the illative still can be treated as a case in Lithuanian. Since the beginning of the 20th century it isn't included in the lists of standard Lithuanian cases in most grammar books and textbooks, and the prepositional construction į+accusative is more frequently used today to denote direction. The illative case was used extensively in older Lithuanian; the first Lithuanian grammar book, by Daniel Klein, mentions both illative and į+accusative but calls the usage of the illative "more elegant". Later, it has often appeared in the written texts of the authors who grew up in Dzūkija or Eastern Aukštaitija, such as Vincas Krėvė-Mickevičius.

The illative case in Lithuanian has its own endings, which are different for each declension paradigm, although quite regular, compared with some other Lithuanian cases. An ending of the illative always ends with -n in the singular, and -sna is the final part of an ending of the illative in the plural.

Certain fixed phrases in the standard language are illatives, such as patraukti atsakomybėn ("to arraign"), dešinėn! ("turn right"), vardan ("for the sake of" or "in the name of", e.g., in the name of the political party "Vardan Lietuvos", "For Lithuania").

Examples of the illative case in Lithuanian
	Nominative		Illative		Gloss
	Singular	Plural	Singular	Plural	Gloss
masc.	karas	karai	karan	karuosna	war(s)
masc.	lokys	lokiai	lokin	lokiuosna	bear(s)
masc.	akmuo	akmenys	akmenin	akmenysna	stone(s)
fem.	upė	upės	upėn	upėsna	river(s)
fem.	jūra	jūros	jūron	jūrosna	sea(s)
fem.	obelis	obelys	obelin	obelysna	apple tree(s)

== In Tungusic languages ==
Tungusic languages have a rich case system, and as shown below the illative is among them:

Declension Table
Case	Vowel stem	Plosive stem	Nasal stem
Nominative	bira	dət	oron
Accusative	bira-βa	dət-pe	oron-mo
Indefinite accusative	bira-ja	dət-je	oron-o
Dative-locative	bira-dū	dət-tū	oron-dū
Allative	bira-tki	dət-tiki	oron-ti
Illative	bira-lā	dət-[tu]lə̄	oron-dulā
Prolative	bira-lī	dət-[tu]lī	oron-dulī
Allative-locative	bira-kla	dət-iklə	oron-ikla
Elative	bira-duk	dət-tuk	oron-duk
Ablative	bira-git	dət-kit	oron-njít
Instrumental	bira t	dət-it	oron-di
