= Finnish profanity =

Finnish profanity is used in the form of intensifiers, adjectives, adverbs and particles, and is based on varying taboos, with religious vulgarity being very prominent. It often uses the aggressive mood which involves omission of the negative verb ei while implying its meaning with a swear word.

Most words in Finnish can be used euphemistically in place of profanity by preceding it with voi (an interjection meaning "oh!"), for example voi paska!, which translates to "oh shit!". This also applies for vieköön (third person singular imperative of the verb viedä "to take"), an example of this is the phrase hiisi vieköön (may the goblin take it). However, this was more prominent in older Finnish. The language also has other similar non-offensive constructs like taivahan talikynttilät which means "tallow candles of heaven", as well as having many non-offensive curse words.

Contemporary Finnish profanity often has old origins; many words have pagan roots that, after Christian influence, were turned from names of deities and spirits to profanity and used as such. In general, the etymology of Finnish swears can be traced either from these formerly religious words or from ancient Finnish words involving excretion or sexual organs or functions. In context of other Nordic countries, Finns rank second, behind Swedes, when it comes to frequency of using profanity.

A list of Finnish profanity has been compiled in Suuri kirosanakirja ("The Great Dictionary of Profanities").

== List of notable Finnish profanities ==
=== Helvetti ===
Helvetti translates to hell and has roughly the same meaning in the English language. It has its roots in the Swedish word helvete, with the same meaning (underworld punishment). An often used phrase is "What the hell?", in Finnish "Mitä helvettiä?". For an augmentative expression, both in a positive or negative sense, helvetin can be prefixed into an adjective, e.g. helvetin hyvä "hellishly good". A pejorative meaning can be achieved by using the same helvetin ("of hell") in front of a noun, e.g. helvetin linkki oli myöhässä "the damned bus was late". Some words used to replace it, depending on dialect, include helkutti, helvata, hemmetti, hemskutti, himputti, helkkari and himskatti. Derivative terms: helvetillinen ("infernal").

=== Hitto, Hiisi ===
Hitto is a relatively mild swear word, but still considered an expletive. A hiisi is a scary mythical creature such as a giant, troll or devil, or its dwelling such as a sacred grove, burial site and on the other hand, hell. The word has a Germanic etymology, either from *sidon "side or direction" (in English, "side"), or *xitha "cave, hollow, crag" (Swedish: ide, "bear's nest"). Its diminutive form is "hittolainen", and the ancient pagan deity Hittavainen is related. The word is in the same category as other "mild" swear words like "helkkari" or "himskatti". Painu hiiteen means "go to hell", while hiisi vieköön is "may the devil take it away!". Hitto is usually translated Damn (it). One of the funniest forms of using hitto could be hitto soikoon, "may the hitto chime", and may be similar to the English phrase "Hell's bells".

=== Huora ===
The word means whore, and like the English word which has the same etymology may be considered too profane to use for its literal meaning in civil conversation; in that case it is replaced by prostituoitu ("prostitute") or seksityöläinen ("sex worker"). It can be used as a derogatory term for a particular person, but is not normally used as a swear word on its own.

=== Jumalauta ===
This is a combination of two words: jumala, meaning god, and auta, meaning help (verb, imperative 2nd person). It is used in a similar fashion to Oh my God/God help (me)! In Finnish it has the same slightly frustrated emphasis. Another translation for Oh, God is Voi luoja (luoja = the creator, a synonym for God). An ad campaign for church aid for third world countries used JumalAuta as an eyecatcher. This raised discussion for being too profane. Though the English expression God help me is an accurate (and literal) translation of jumalauta, a translation to goddamn it may be considered more correct, as the literal translation lacks the undertones of profanity. Often used replacement words are jumankauta, jumaliste or jumalavita.

=== Kulli ===
A slang word for a penis used similarly to "cock" in English, though considered less profane than "kyrpä", meaning the same thing. Pronounced [ˈkulːli].

=== Kusi ===
Kusi, pronounced [ˈkusi], means "urine" with a similar connotation to "piss". By itself it refers to actual urine and is considered only mildly offensive in colloquial language. The etymology is traced up to Proto-Uralic, the earliest known protolanguage of Finnish, thus having cognates in other Uralic languages, such as húgy in the Hungarian language. It is used to form compound words, such as kusipää (pisshead, common translation of "asshole"), as very offensive insults. Inoffensive synonyms are the clinical term virtsa ("urine") and the childish pissa ("pee"). The word pissa has drifted so far into everyday usage that in combined form pissapoika (pissing boy) it refers specifically to the squirter on the windshield of cars. Foreign visitors have been amused by the product "Superpiss" for windshield wiper fluid. Derivative terms: kusettaa (jotakuta) "to defraud, to cheat (someone)", similar in meaning as "to bullshit (someone)", kusettaa (in passive mood) "feel an urge to urinate" (these differ by case government: the former is always accompanied by a subject in the partitive case), kusinen "shitty" or "stained with piss" (e.g. kusinen paikka "up shit creek"), juosten kustu literally "pissed while running", meaning half-assed, hastily done, shoddy, incompetent work, and kustu muroihin "pissed in cereal", referring to a disservice, an act that hurts someone or the common benefit.

=== Kyrpä ===
Literally "cock" in the sense of "penis"; often considered highly offensive. The word nearly always refers to an actual penis and may be used, for example, to express frustration: Voi kyrpä! "Oh fuck!". The widespread verb vituttaa "to feel angry and depressed" originates from its meaning "to want vagina". One form of using the word is "kyrpä otsassa", which means that something really pisses you off. The literal meaning is "to have a dick on the forehead".

=== Molo ===
Usually used only literally for "penis", somewhat profane. Has a derivation molopää, corresponding to English "dickhead".

=== Mulkku ===
Has the literal meaning "penis", but may refer, like English "prick", to an unpleasant man, both as a noun and as an adjective. When referring to a man, it is nowadays sometimes combined with Swedish surname ending -qvist, to form mulqvist or mulkvisti, which is considered less harsh than mulkku. In some dialects word mulkku is pronounced with an extra /u/ sound (epenthetic vowel), i.e. mulukku.

=== Muna ===
Literally means "egg" and may refer to a literal penis, but is not considered an insult or particularly profane. For example, there is a gay cruise named Munaristeily, which is publicly marketed as such. It also means "testicle", usually said in plural form munat "testicles". Olla munaa can mean either being courageous or just obscene, to "have balls". Conversely, munaton means "gutless", "lacking in mettle", "cowardly". There has been some controversy whether it can be considered obscene enough that uttering it constitutes slander.

=== Paska ===
Paska translates as "shit" or "crap" and has approximately the same context in English and Finnish, although it may be more profane. It has the same connotations of "shoddy" or "broken", which may even surpass the word's use in the original sense in frequency. Inoffensive synonyms are kakka ("poo"), especially with children, and the clinical uloste ("excrement"). Uloste appears to have been introduced as a high-class replacement in the 1800s, while paska is believed to have been in continuous use since at least the Proto-Finnic of 3000 BC. Doubt and disbelief are expressed with hevonpaska ("horse's shit", compare "bullshit") and paskan marjat ("shit berries"). It can be combined with vittu as in "Vittu tätä paskaa" ("fuck this shit"). A Finnish rock musician goes by the name, and Paskahousu ("shitpants") is a card game, a relative of Shithead that's popular with children and teenagers. Derivative terms: paskiainen "bastard" (or "son of a bitch"), paskamainen "unfair, depressing, unpleasant, shitty", paskainen "(literally) shitty", paskapää "(literally) shithead".

=== Perkele ===
Perkele, devil, was originally imported from Baltic languages, and is believed to be connected to the Baltic god of thunder (compare: Lithuanian: Perkūnas, Latvian: Pērkons, Prussian: Perkūns, Yotvingian: Parkuns), as an alternate name for the thunder god of Finnish paganism, Ukko, and co-opted by the Christian church. In an early translation of the Bible to Finnish, the word was stated to be a word for the devil, thus making it a sin to be uttered. (In a 1992 Bible translation, "perkele" was replaced with "paholainen".) Perkele or Ukko was known as the rain and thundergod, similar to Thor of Norse mythology. The "r" is rolled and can be lengthened, which can be transcribed by spelling with more r's.

The word is very common in the country and likely the best known expletive abroad, and enjoys a kind of emblematic status. For instance, the Finnish black metal band Impaled Nazarene named its 1994 patriotic album Suomi Finland Perkele (using the word as a reference to Finnishness, not to the devil) and the more conventional M. A. Numminen released a 1971 album known as Perkele! Lauluja Suomesta ("Perkele! Songs from Finland"). When used to express discontent or frustration, perkele often suggests that the speaker is determined to solve the problem, even if it will be difficult. It is associated with sisu, which in turn is an iconic Finnish trait. Professor Kulonen has described perkele as being ingrained in the older generations, as opposed to kyrpä and vittu for the younger ones. A common and milder replacement word is perhana, and less popular variations include perkules, perskuta, perskuta rallaa and perkeleissön. The word has lent itself to a Swedish expression for Finnish business management practices, "management by perkele". Derivative terms: perkeleellinen "infernal", perkelöityä "to escalate".

=== Perse ===
Perse ("ass") can be used either literally or as a semi-strong swear word. It is often found in expressions like "Tämä on perseestä" ("This (situation) is from the ass!" or "This sucks!") The similarities with the Latin phrase "per se", the Hungarian "persze" (which means "of course", comes from the aforementioned Latin and is pronounced mostly the same way), the hero Perseus and the ancient city of Persepolis are purely coincidental, although the wide use of "persze" in spoken Hungarian could sound somewhat embarrassing to Finnish visitors. Derivative terms: perseet (olalla), literally "to have one's arse up on one's shoulders", that is, "drunk".

=== Pillu ===
Pillu translates to "pussy" in the sense of female genitalia and, although it is not used as swear word, it is profane and unsuitable in all but the most familiar and informal conversation. Non-profane synonyms for the literal meaning include römpsä, tavara (lit. "stuff"), toosa (actually an oldish dialectical name with Swedish origin for a little box, container, "dosa"; it can also refer to televisions, electronics or machinery), pimppi, pimpsa, tuhero, tussu. The phrase tuhannen pillun päreiksi ("into shingles for thousand pussies") is similar or like the English saying "blown to smithereens", i.e. broken into thousands of pieces. It exhibits the tendency for alliteration in Finnish expressions. A pillunpäre ("pussy shingle") is a wood shingle used as a disposable bench cover in saunas. Antaa pillua ("give pussy") means that a woman agrees to sexual intercourse with someone, and saada pillua ("get some pussy") means that a man gets permission from a woman to have intercourse with her.

=== Piru ===
Piru, meaning devil, is not always considered a swearword but sometimes used in a similar fashion to the word damn: "Piru vieköön" (lit. "let (the) Devil take (it)"). A more proper word for devil is paholainen. The derivative word pirullinen ("devilish", "diabolical") is used as in English; piruuttaan is roughly equivalent to "just for kicks", but the literal meaning "out of one's devilishness" is a more accurate translation.

=== Reva ===
Reva is another reference to the female genitalia, akin to "vittu" (see below). It is also used to refer to backside ("perse" or ass). It is not considered an actual swearword, but carries a notion of vulgarity. The former chairman of Finnish Parliament, Riitta Uosukainen, used the word in her controversial autobiography Liehuva liekinvarsi, where she described herself in sexual encounters between her and Topi Uosukainen as rintaa, reittä ja revää [sic] ("[I was nothing but]... breasts, thighs and quim.") Reva is also used occasionally in reference to buttocks and can therefore also be translated as "arse". A loose translation for Täyden kympin reva is "Top class arse".

=== Runkata ===
Runkata (verb) is an informal and profane word that means "to masturbate". "Runkata", and the agent runkkari or runkku ("wanker", "jerk-off") are quite offensive words and rarely used outside of direct insults, most often combined with other swearwords. When used by itself, its meaning is normally more literal.

=== Ryökäle ===
Scoundrel. A curse word specific to the older generation, now considered non-offensive.

=== Saatana ===
Saatana means quite literally Satan, but used in a similar fashion to helvetti. Often used less crude replacement words for it are saamari, samperi and saakeli. Along with "perkele", "vittu" and "jumalauta", this is one of the most classic and most used words in Finnish. Often used together with helvetti as saatanan helvetti. The derivative term saatanallinen ("satanic") is used in context as in English. Finnish group The Dudesons, in The Dudesons Movie, declared Saatana and Perkele to be the most common things heard on the show, Perkele being Satan's grandfather.

=== Skeida ===
Skeida ['skeidɑ] is Helsinki slang for "shit". Because of its newer origin, it is considered less profane than paska, although still considered impolite. Skeida can be used as a profane insult (tää on täyttä skeidaa "this is full of shit") but unlike paska, it is not used as an exclamation or a curse by itself. Although the word is fairly well known in Helsinki, people from outside the capital area might not understand it. Skeida is also used to mean garbage or trash.

=== Vittu ===
Vittu is a word meaning the female genitalia. though in modern times it is colloquially used the same as "fuck" in English. In use one might say voi vittu similar to the English expression "oh fuck" to exclaim displeasure at an experienced event. Derived from the word, the expression vituttaa, meaning to be pissed off or annoyed about an event, also exists in modern Finnish lexicon.
