= Hungarians in Finland =

Total population
- 3,000

Regions with significant populations
- Helsinki, Kauhajoki, Espoo, Tampere, Turku, Vantaa

Languages
- Hungarian · Finnish

Religion
- Christianity (predominantly Catholicism)

Related ethnic groups
- Hungarian diaspora

There is a slightly large community of Hungarians in Finland (Hungarian: Finnországi magyarok; Finnish: Suomen unkarilaiset).

== History ==
Prior to the late 1960s, most Hungarians came to Finland due to family, work or cultural and religious reasons. In the late 1980s and early 1990s, Finland took some Hungarian refugees from Romania. Since the 1990s, many Hungarians came to Finland as guest workers or exchange students. Before the 1980s, there were only 150 Hungarians in Finland.

In 2014, there were 2,600 people in Finland who spoke Hungarian, some of them coming from Transylvania. In the 2000s, Hungarians were employed by Nokia and in recent years, Hungarians have moved to, among other places, Ostrobothnia to work in the grocery sector. Many of the Hungarian immigrants to Finland have been musicians.

== Hungarian organizations in Finland ==
Bóbita ry is the most active Hungarian organization in Finland, located in the Helsinki region.

== Notable people ==
- Réka Szilvay - violinist
- Johanna Debreczeni - singer
- Aladár Paasonen - soldier
- Kati Kovács - cartoonist
- Sami Garam - chef
- Károly Garam - cellist
- Tamás Gruborovics - footballer
- Nándor Mikola - painter
- Géza Szilvay - violinist
- Ville Valo - singer
- Benedek Oláh - tennis player

== See also ==
- Finland–Hungary relations
- Hungarian diaspora
- Immigration to Finland
