= Aggressive mood =

Verb construction in the Finnish language

The aggressive (Finnish: aggressiivi) is a verb construction that occurs in the Finnish language, especially in emotional outbursts. It expresses negation or rejection and resembles a negative clause, but it lacks the Finnish negative auxiliary. Instead, the aggressive is often marked with an obscene word, which tends to be seen as a distinctive feature of the construction. The aggressive has playfully been described as a grammatical mood by the inventor of the term, but the construction operates on the syntactical level and morphologically the verb is in a regular mood (typically in the indicative). It is only found in the vernacular, with the written examples almost always being an example of code-switching.

The aggressive is in vogue particularly with the youth, but the characteristic omission of the negative auxiliary has already been found in samples of dialectal Finnish recorded in the early 20th century. Even though the construction is not uncommon in colloquial Finnish, little attention has been paid to it in Finnish grammars, as it has mostly been regarded as an exceptional variant of the negative clause.

== Characteristics ==
The characteristics of the aggressive were analyzed by Lari Kotilainen in his doctoral dissertation in 2007. According to Kotilainen, the aggressive is an affective and reactive construction where the negative auxiliary is omitted and the main verb tends to be at the end. In addition, there is often an expletive (obscene) word at the beginning and the construction tends to include a semi-negative word – typically mitään '[not] anything', which can be analyzed as a pronoun or an adverb. More specifically, Kotilainen has identified four main varieties of the construction (below, nearly word-by-word translations into English are given with extra clarifications in square brackets):

- The negative construction without the negative auxiliary (an optional expletive + complements and adjuncts and adverbs connected to the verb + the negative form of the main verb).
  (Vittu) mä mitään tiedä! '(Fuck) I anything know [not]!'
- The affirmative-negative construction (an expletive in singular or plural + complements and adjuncts and adverbs connected to the verb + the affirmative form of the main verb).
  Vittu mä mitään tiedän! 'Fuck I anything know [fuck I don't know anything]!'
- The repetitive construction (an expletive in plural + the affirmative form of the main verb with the lexeme mentioned earlier).
  Paskat tiedän! 'Shit [if] I know!'
- The paskat välitän construction (the grammatical subject + an expletive in plural + the verb välittää 'to care' + complements and adjuncts connected to the verb).
  Mä paskat välitän siitä! 'I shit care about it [I don't give a shit]!'

== Origin of the term ==
In his dissertation, Kotilainen does not directly refer to the construction as "the aggressive", but he mentions that such a name has been used of the negative construction without the negative auxiliary. Elsewhere, he has himself repeatedly used it to refer to a negative construction that includes no negative auxiliary.

The Finnish term aggressiivi first appeared in a parody of linguistic argumentation written by Jaakko Häkkinen in 1999. It was coined by shortening the adjective aggressiivinen 'aggressive' into a novel noun inspired by the existing noun egressiivi (referring to the completely unrelated egressive case of the Komi language). Häkkinen's pseudo-scientific definition describes the aggressive as a recently discovered affective negative verb mood in the Finnish language. The verbs in Häkkinen's examples are morphologically in the indicative mood, but according to his description it is typical for the "aggressive mood" to prefix vittu ('fuck', literally 'cunt' but largely diluted owing to its high frequency especially in the vernacular of young people) as a mock bound morpheme to a pronoun that functions as the grammatical subject of the clause (vittumä sinne mene 'fuck-I there go [fuck I won't go there]') or, alternatively, to a pronoun in a locative case (vittusiellä ketään ole 'fuck-there anybody is [fuck there won't be anybody there]').

Häkkinen's joke was first published in Siulaset, the zine of the students of Finnish and Finno-Ugric languages at the University of Helsinki, and later republished in Suomen Kuvalehti (1/2000), a magazine in nationwide circulation. Since then, the joke has been posted and reposted on various Internet forums, but often with additions that miss the original idea of a grammatical mood and focus on the use of the expletive. Sometimes the aggressive has mistakenly been described as a grammatical case or part of speech.

== See also ==
- Finnish profanity
- Jespersen's cycle
