= Possessive affix =

Affix attached to a noun for possessive

In linguistics, a possessive affix (from Latin: affixum possessivum) is an affix (usually suffix or prefix) attached to a noun to indicate its possessor, much in the manner of possessive adjectives.

Possessive affixes are found in many languages of the world. The World Atlas of Language Structures lists 642 languages with possessive suffixes, possessive prefixes, or both out of a total sample of 902 languages. Possessive suffixes are found in some Austronesian, Uralic, Altaic, Semitic, and Indo-European languages. Complicated systems are found in the Uralic languages; for example, Nenets has 27 (3×3×3) different types of forms distinguish the possessor (first-, second- or third-person), the number of possessors (singular, dual or plural) and the number of objects (singular, dual or plural). That allows Nenets-speakers to express the phrase "we two's many houses" in one word. Mayan languages and Nahuan languages also have possessive prefixes.

== Uralic languages ==
=== Finnish ===
Finnish uses possessive suffixes. The number of possessors and their person can be distinguished for the singular and plural except for the third person. However, the construction hides the number of possessed objects when the singular objects are in nominative or genitive case and plural objects in nominative case since käteni may mean either "my hand" (subject or direct object), "of my hand" (genitive) or "my hands" (subject or direct object). For example, the following are the forms of talo (house), declined to show possession:

person	number	Finnish word	English phrase
first-person	singular	taloni	my house(s)
first-person	plural	talomme	our house(s)
second-person	singular	talosi	your (sing.) house(s)
second-person	plural	talonne	your (pl.) house(s)
third-person		talonsa	his/her/their house(s)

The grammatical cases are not affected by the possessive suffix except for the accusative case (-n or unmarked), which is left unmarked by anything other than the possessive suffix. The third-person suffix is used only if the possessor is the subject. For example, Mari maalasi talonsa "Mari painted her house", cf. the use of the genitive case in Toni maalasi Marin talon "Toni painted Mari's house". (The -n on the word talon is the accusative case, which is pronounced the same as the genitive case.)

For emphasis or clarification, the possessor can be given outside the word as well, using the genitive case. In this case, the possessive suffix remains. For example, my house can be taloni or minun taloni in which minun is the genitive form of the first-person singular pronoun.

Omission of the possessive suffix makes it possible to distinguish the plural for the possessed objects, but that is not considered proper language: mun käsi "my hand" vs. mun kädet "my hands". Systematic omission of possessive suffixes is found in Spoken Finnish, wherever a pronoun in the genitive is used, but that is found only in direct address: "Their coats are dry" is Niiden takit on kuivia (niiden lit. "they's"). That can be contrasted with indirect possession, as in "They took their coats", in which the possessive suffix is used: Ne otti takkinsa. Even in proper Finnish, the pronouns sen and niiden, which are the demonstrative as well as inanimate forms of hänen and heidän, do not impose possessive suffixes except indirectly. It would be hypercorrect to say niiden talonsa. There is also a distinction in meaning in the third person on whether or not the third-person possessive pronoun is used:

He ottivat (omat) takkinsa. = "They took their (own) coats." (The possessor cannot be mentioned, even for emphasis, when it the same as the subject.)
He ottivat heidän takkinsa. = "They took their (others') coats." (When a third person pronoun is mentioned as the possessor, it must refer to someone other than the subject of the sentence.)
He kertoivat tulevansa (itse). = "They told they would come (themselves)." (The doer cannot be mentioned, even for emphasis, when it is the same as previously.)
He kertoivat heidän tulevan. = "They told they (others) would come." (When a third person pronoun is mentioned as the subject of the second sentence, it must refer to someone other than the subject of the first sentence.)

=== Hungarian ===
Hungarian is another Uralic language. Distantly related to Finnish, Hungarian follows similar rule as given above for Finnish, except that it does not use genitive case for emphasis. To say "Maria's house", one would say Mária háza: literally 'Maria her house', where háza means 'her/his/its house' (see His genitive).

See also Possessive suffixes in the article Hungarian grammar (noun phrases).

== Semitic languages ==
=== Arabic ===
Arabic, a Semitic language, uses personal suffixes, also classified as enclitic pronouns, for the genitive and accusative cases of the personal pronouns. The genitive and accusative forms are identical, except for the 1st person singular, which is -ī in genitive and -nī in accusative case. They can be used with nouns, expressing possession, with prepositions, which require the genitive case, or with verbs, expressing the object. Examples for personal suffixes expressing possession, using the word بيت bayt(u) (house) as a base:

person	singular	dual	plural
1st person	بيتي baytī my house	بيتنا baytunā our house	
2nd person (masc.)	بيتك baytuka your house	بيتكما baytukumā your (du.) house	بيتكم baytukum your house
2nd person (fem.)	بيتك baytuki your house	بيتكما baytukumā your (du.) house	بيتكن baytukunna your house
3rd person (masc.)	بيته baytuhu/baytuhi his house	بيتهما baytuhumā their (du.) house	بيتهم baytuhum/baytuhim their house
3rd person (fem.)	بيتها baytuhā her house	بيتهما baytuhumā their (du.) house	بيتهن baytuhun(na)/baytuhin(ne) their house

=== Hebrew ===
In Hebrew, a Northwest Semitic language, possessive suffixes are optional. They are more common in formal, archaic, or poetic language and for certain nouns than on others. For instance, my home can be written בֵּיתִי (beiti). However, the following are some different ways to express possession, using the word בַּיִת (bayit, house) as a base:

- my house: בֵּיתִי beiti (house-my), הַבַּיִת שֶׁלִּי ha-bayit sheli (the-house of-me)
- your (masc., sing.) house: בֵּיתְךָ beitkha (house-your), הַבַּיִת שֶׁלְּךָ ha-bayit shelkha (the-house of-you)
- your (fem., sing.) house: בֵּיתֵךְ beitekh (house-your), הַבַּיִת שֶׁלָּךְ ha-bayit shelakh (the-house of-you)
- his house: בֵּיתוֹ beito (house-his), הַבַּיִת שֶׁלּוֹ ha-bayit shelo (the-house of-him)
- her house: בֵּיתָהּ beitah (house-her), הַבַּיִת שֶׁלָּהּ ha-bayit shelah (the-house of-her)
- our house: בֵּיתֵנוּ beitenu (house-our), הַבַּיִת שֶׁלָּנוּ ha-bayit shelanu (the-house of-us)
- your (masc., pl.) house: בֵּיתְכֶם beitkhem (house-your), הַבַּיִת שֶׁלָּכֶם ha-bayit shelakhem (the-house of-you)
- your (fem., pl.) house: בֵּיתְכֶן beitkhen (house-your), הַבַּיִת שֶׁלָכֶן ha-bayit shelakhen (the-house of-you)
- their (masc.) house: בֵּיתָם beitam (house-their), הַבַּיִת שֶׁלָּהֶם ha-bayit shelahem (the-house of-them)
- their (fem.) house: בֵּיתָן beitam (house-their), הַבַּיִת שֶׁלָּהֶן ha-bayit shelahen (the-house of-them)
- Adam's house: בֵּית אָדָם beit Adam (house-of Adam), בֵּיתוֹ שֶׁל אָדָם beito shel Adam (house-his of Adam), הַבַּיִת שֶׁל אָדָם ha-bayit shel Adam (the-house of Adam)

=== Assyrian ===
In Assyrian Neo-Aramaic, a Modern Aramaic language, possessive pronouns are suffixes that are attached to the end of nouns to express possession similar to the English pronouns my, your, his, her, etc., which reflects the gender and the number of the person or persons.

person	singular	plural
1st person	bĕtī (my house)	bĕtan (our house)
2nd person (masc.)	bĕtūkh (your house)	bĕtōkhun (your house)
2nd person (fem.)	bĕtakh (your house)	bĕtōkhun (your house)
3rd person (masc.)	bĕtū (his house)	betĕh (their house)
3rd person (fem.)	bĕtō (her house)	bĕtĕh (their house)

Although possessive suffixes are more convenient and common, they can be optional for some people and seldom used, especially among those with the Tyari and Barwari dialects. The following are the alternative ways to express possession, using the word "bĕtā" (house) as a base:

- my house: bĕtā it dēyi ("house of mine")
- your (masc., sing.) house: bĕtā it dēyūkh ("house of yours")
- your (fem., sing.) house: bĕtā it dēyakh
- your (plural) house: bĕtā it dēyōkhūn ("house of yours")
- 3rd person (masc., sing.): bĕtā it dēyū ("house of his")
- 3rd person (fem., sing.): bĕtā it dēyō ("house of hers")
- 3rd person (plural): bĕtā it dēyĕh ("house of theirs")

== Indo-European languages ==
=== Armenian ===
In Armenian, the following suffixes are used (Eastern standard):

Person	Example	Translation
1st person	տուն-ս /tun-s/	my house
2nd person	տուն-դ /tun-t/	your house
3rd person	տուն-ը /tun-ə/	his/her house

=== Persian ===
Persian, an Indo-European language, has possessive suffixes:

person	Suffix
1st person singular	-am
2nd person singular	-at
3rd person singular	-aš
1st person plural	-emân
2nd person plural	-etân
3rd person plural	-ešân

e.g. pedar-am my father; barâdar-aš his/her brother

== Central Morocco Tamazight ==
Central Morocco Tamazight's use of possessive suffixes mirrors that of many other Afro-Asiatic languages.

Possessive Suffixes
Person	Possessive suffix	
Person	(Ayt Ayache)	(Ayt Seghrouchen)
I	/-(i)nw/^{1}	
you (ms)	/-nʃ/	/-nːs/
you (fs)	/-nːm/	
he	/-ns/	/-nːs/
she	/-ns/	/-nːs/
we	/-nːɣ/	/-nːx/
you (mp)	/-nːun/	
you (fp)	/-nːkʷnt/	/-nːʃnt/
they (m)	/-nsn/	/-nːsn/
they (f)	/-nsnt/	/-nːsnt/

1. -inw is used when the noun ends in a consonant

Independent possessives are formed by attaching the possessive suffixes to /wi-/ (if the object possessed is masculine) or /ti-/' (for feminine), e.g. /winw/ ('mine').

== Turkish ==
Possessive forms of the noun ev ("house"):

person	singular	Translation	plural	Translation
1st person	(benim) evim	my house	(bizim) evimiz	our house
2nd person	(senin) evin	your house	(sizin) eviniz	your house
3rd person	(onun) evi	(his/her/its) house	(onların) evleri	their house

The plural of ev is evler, and the form evleri is ambiguous; it can be ev + -leri "their house", with the 3rd-person plural possessive suffix, or evler + -i "his/her/its houses", with the 3rd-person singular possessive suffix. Additionally, when suffixed to a plural form, the plural suffix -leri is replaced by -i, so "their houses" is not *evlerleri but just also evleri, making this form triply ambiguous.

The Turkish possessive suffixes obey vowel harmony (ok – "arrow"; okum – "my arrow"; okları – "their arrow" or "his/her/their arrows"). If the word to which they are attached ends on a vowel, an initial vowel of the possessive suffix is elided (baba – "father"; babam – "my father").

== Malay ==
In Malay, an Austronesian language, the following suffixes can be added to nouns to indicate possession.

Person	Example	Translation
1st person	negaraku	my country
2nd person	negaramu	your country
3rd person	negaranya	his/her country

Not all pronouns are added in this way; most are written as separate words. For example, your country can also be expressed as negara anda or negara engkau, and our country as negara kita (if the reader is included) or negara kami (if the reader is excluded).

== Classical Nahuatl ==
Classical Nahuatl, an Uto-Aztecan language, uses possessive prefixes.

Person	Example	Translation
1st person singular	no-ta	my father
2nd person singular	mo-ta	your (sg.) father
3rd person singular	i-ta	his/her father
1st person plural	to-ta	our father
2nd person plural	amo-ta	your (pl.) father
3rd person plural	in-ta	their father
indefinite	te-ta	one's father

== See also ==
- Possessive apostrophe
- Possessive case
