= Benedek Oláh =

Finnish table tennis player

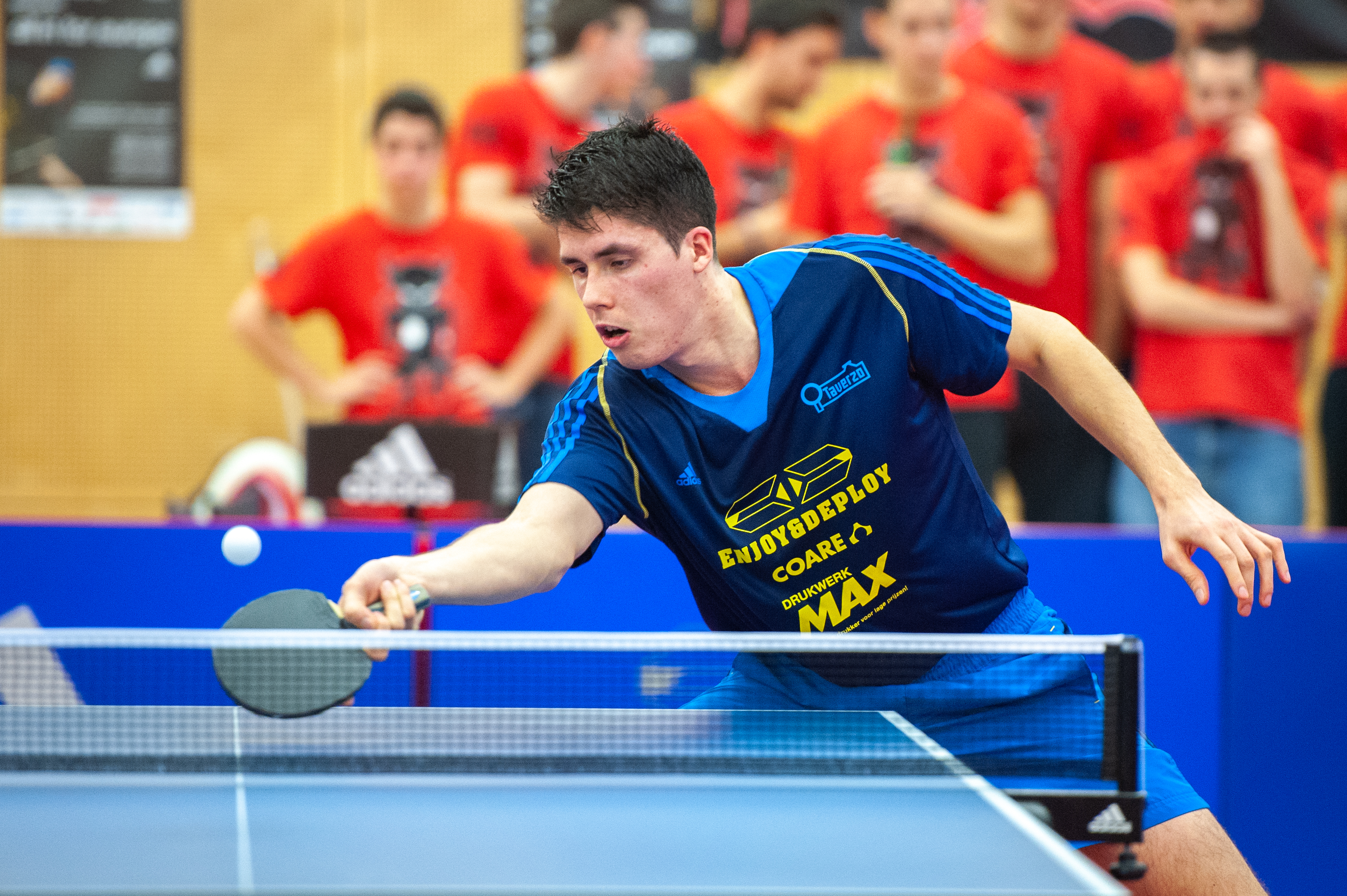

Personal information
- Full name: Benedek Márton Oláh
- Born: 29 March 1991 (age 35) Kalajoki, Finland
- Height: 1.91 m (6 ft 3 in)

Sport
- Sport: Table tennis
- Club: Bay Area Blasters
- Highest ranking: 50 (28 June 2022)
- Current ranking: 809 (28 September 2026)

Benedek Márton Oláh (born 29 March 1991) is a Finnish table tennis player. He is the first Finnish Olympian in table tennis competition.

By 2025, Oláh had been named Finland's Table Tennis Player of the Year 16 consecutive times by the Association of Sports Journalists.

== Early life ==
Oláh was born to Hungarian parents in Kalajoki, Finland, but grew up in Seinäjoki.

== Career ==
In 2016, Oláh won an ITTF World Tour title in men's singles at the Nigeria Open. He competed at the 2016 Summer Olympics in the men's singles event, in which he was eliminated in the second round by Jonathan Groth. From this, he made history as the first Finnish Olympian to participate in the table tennis competition.

=== 2021 ===
Benedek entered WTT Doha 2021 with a world rank of 85. He upset world ranked 69 Chen Chien-an in the second round of the qualifying draw in the WTT Contender event. Benedek would lose to world-ranked number 144 Andreas Levenko in the next round; however, Levenko would go on to have a highly successful tournament, including an upset of world ranked number 15 Liam Pitchford.

=== Major League Table Tennis ===
In 2024, Oláh joined Major League Table Tennis (MLTT), the first professional table tennis league in the United States. He was selected by the Princeton Revolution as a first-round pick in the 2024 MLTT draft. Competing in the Eastern Conference, Oláh became the lead player for the Revolution, known for his signature backhand and high winning percentage in singles matches.

He is a 29-time Finnish national table tennis champion – 12-time champion in singles and 6-time champion in mixed doubles.

== Personal life ==
Before moving to Budapest, Hungary, in 2014, Oláh had lived in the Netherlands, Sweden and Germany. In 2026, he married Mongolian-born Byambasuren Sodnomsambuu in Budapest.
