= Sami Garam =

Finnish cook and writer

- Born: 31 October 1967 (age 58); Helsinki, Finland
- Spouse: Päivi Garam
- Children: Petra Garam, Kasper Garam, Julia Garam

Sami Garam (born 31 October 1967 in Helsinki) is a Finnish cook and writer of Hungarian descent.

== Background ==
The son of Károly and Sirkka Garam (née Saarikoski). Sami Garam's mother, Sirkka Garam, is the sister of the Finnish poet Pentti Saarikoski. Sami Garam's main profession is cooking, and he has worked as chef in many restaurants, receiving high acclaim for his food. Garam's other interest is literature, and he has written several books in Helsinki slang, including slang versions of classic Finnish novels and the first-ever Helsinki slang versions of Aku Ankka ("Donald Duck" in Finnish) and Asterix comic books.

Sami Garam has three children, two daughters (born 1991 and 1992) and a son (born 1995), and is married to Päivi Garam for over 15 years.

== Bibliography ==
- Rotsi on mut byysat puuttuu (Aku Ankka album), 2000
- Snögeli ja seittemän snadii starbuu (Snow White), WSOY 2001
- Jörde-Juge (Der Struwwelper), 2001
- Stadilainen tsöge (cookbook), WSOY 2002
- Allu Stemun Seittemän broidii (Aleksis Kivi: Seven Brothers), WSOY 2003
- Daijulastooreja (Finnish folk stories), WSOY 2004
- Kessen rehukotsa (Asterix album), 2005
- Puolialaston kokki (Donald Duck cooking book), Sanoma Magazines Finland 2005
- Pidot Ankkalinnassa (Donald Duck cooking book), Sanoma Magazines Finland 2006
- gAstronominen keittokirja (gastronomical cook book) 2008

== Sources ==
- WSOY author gallery page for Sami Garam (in Finnish)
