= Finland–Hungary relations =

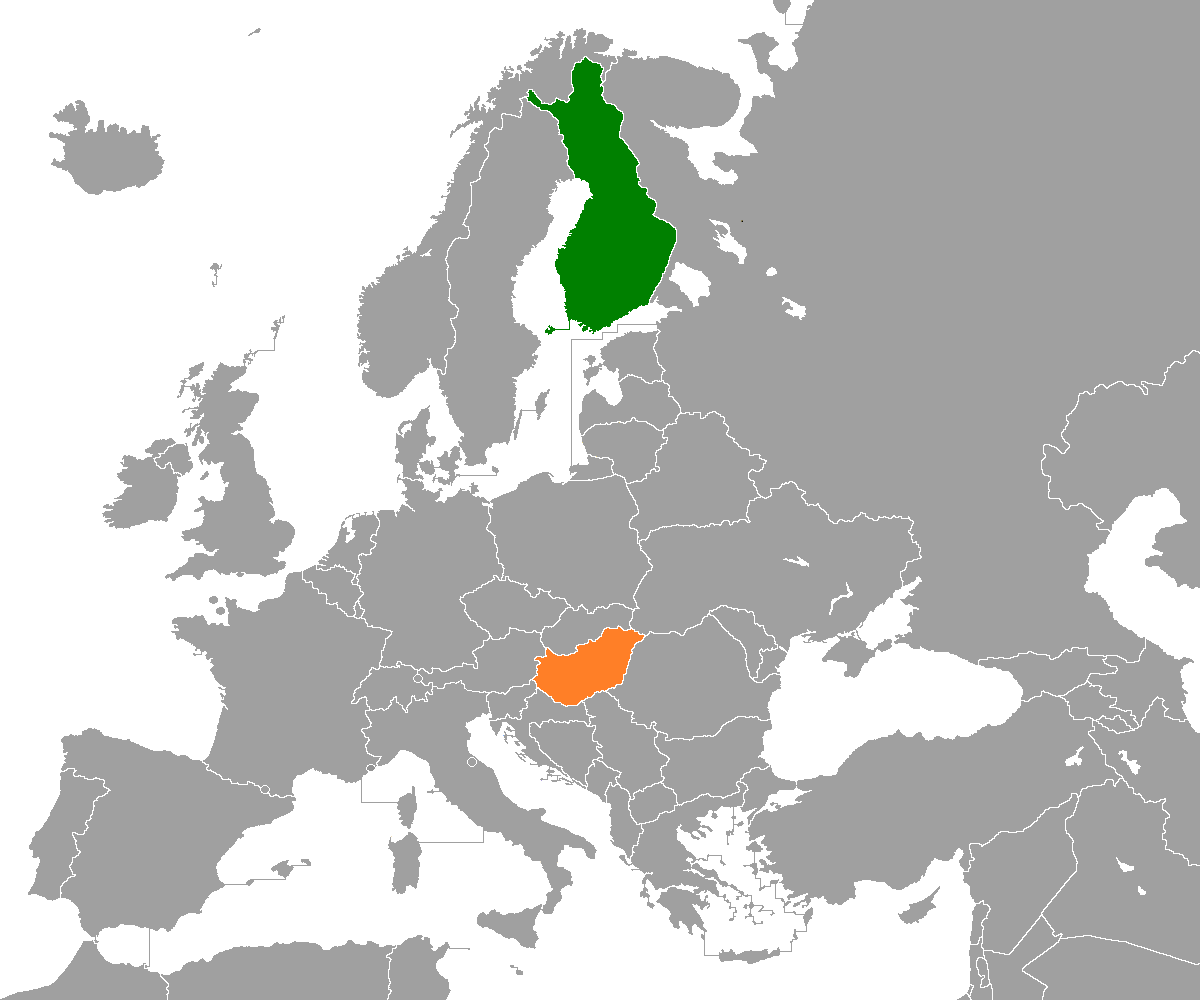

- Finland: Hungary

Diplomatic mission
- Embassy of Finland, Budapest: Embassy of Hungary, Helsinki

Finland–Hungary relations are the bilateral relations between Finland and Hungary. Both countries are members of the European Union, Council of Europe, NATO, and the Organization for Security and Co-operation in Europe. Both people’s language are part of the Uralic language family. In March 2023, Hungary fully approved Finland's application for NATO membership. There is minor tension in Finno-Hungarian relations at the advent of the Russo-Ukrainian and the Russo-Georgian wars, as Finland places themselves as staunchly against Russia in these conflicts, where as Hungary is far more neutral.

== History ==
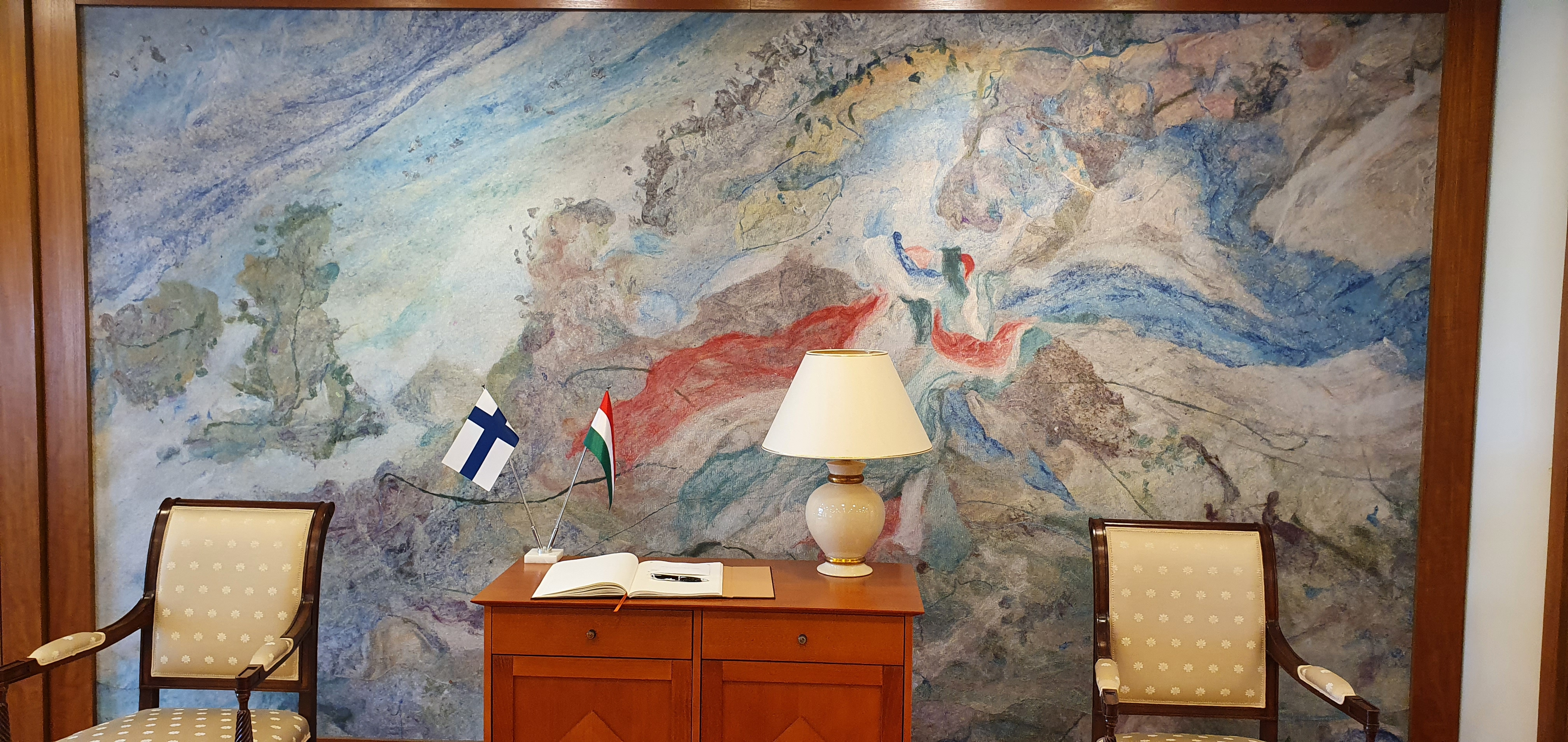
Embassy of Hungary in Helsinki, foyer of the reception area with a wall carpet designed by András Gönci in 1999

=== Before independence ===
At the end of the 19th century the Finno-Ugric linguistic affinity became widely accepted after extensive public debate, though this had little effect on the relation between the two regions. In the First World War, particularly the Russian and Finnish Civil Wars, Hungary supported separatists, mainly Poland, but this included Finland to an extent.

=== Independence ===
Hungary recognized Finland on August 23, 1920. Finland recognized Hungary on September 10, 1920. Both nations gained independence from their respective overlords at the end of the First World War. Hungary in the Treaty of Trianon, and Finland in the Treaty of Tartu.

=== World War II ===
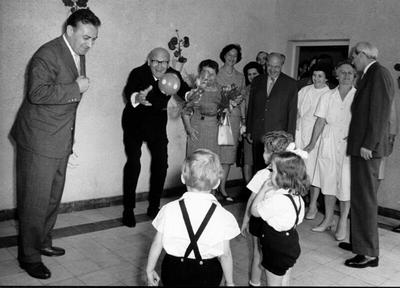
Urho Kekkonen visit in Hungary in 1963

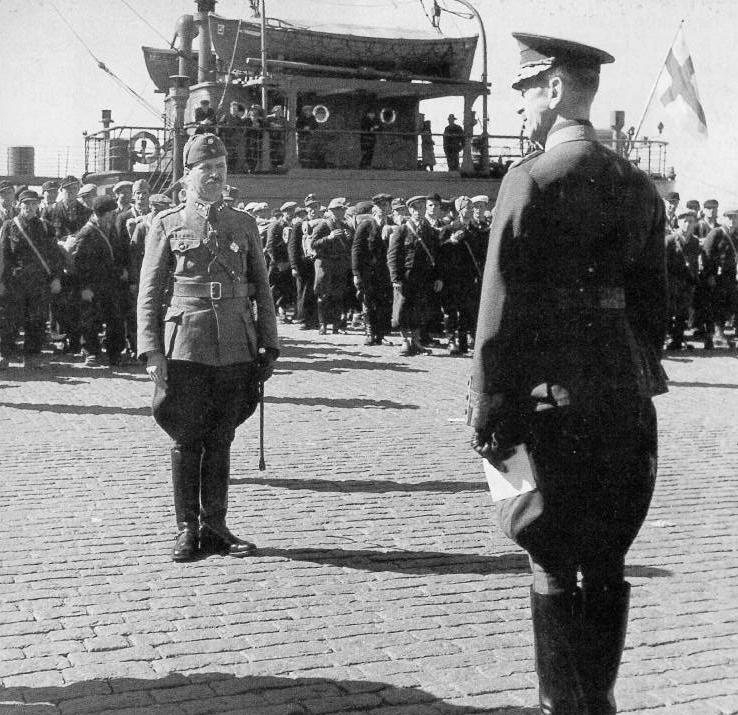
Hungarian volunteers leaving Finland after the Winter War. The group was led by Captain Imre Kémeri Nagy. Seeing him off was Lieutenant General Oscar Enckell.

When the Winter War broke out between Finland and the Soviet Union, many Hungarians felt great sympathy towards the Finns and wanted to help them.

From the onset of the Winter War onwards both nations placed themselves on the side of Germany, though Finland never officially joined the Axis.

The Hungarian government officially did not support Finland, but secretly started searching for ways of helping. In addition, non-governmental organisations began to organize support for Finland. Hungary helped Finland by giving monetary donations, armaments and military volunteers.

After losing the Continuation War, Finland discontinued diplomatic relations on September 20, 1944.

=== Post World War II ===
Diplomatic relations were re-established on May 20, 1947. Finland has an embassy in Budapest and an honorary consulate in Pécs. Hungary has an embassy in Helsinki and 4 honorary consulates (in Turku, Mariehamn, Tampere and Joensuu). on January 1st 1995 Finland joined the EU which was supported by Hungary even before it became a EU member itself, in march of 2023 Hungary supported Finland joining NATO and Finland joined NATO in April of 2023.

== Resident diplomatic missions ==
- Finland has an embassy in Budapest. The current Finnish ambassador to Hungary is Jari Vilén
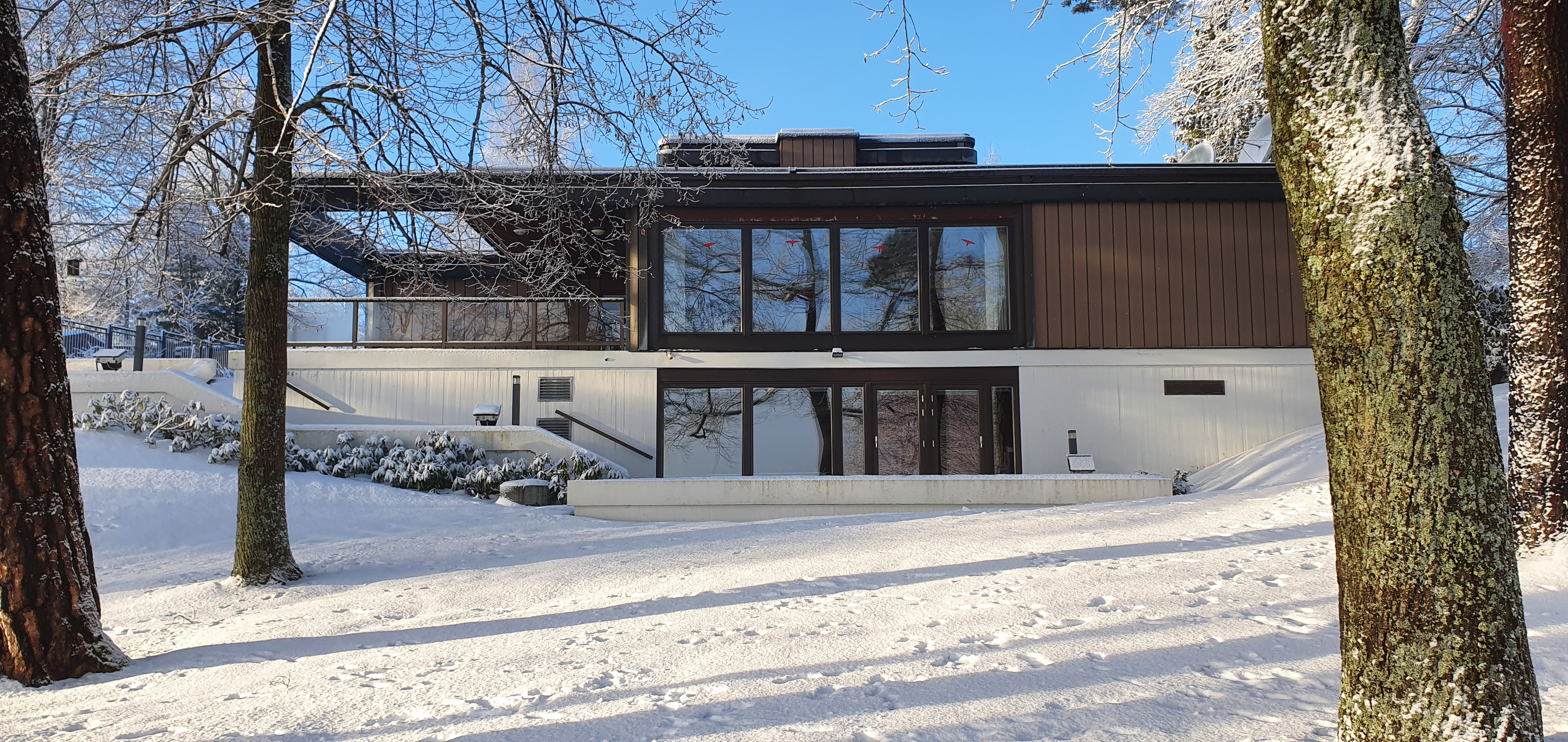
  Embassy of Hungary in Helsinki
- Hungary has an embassy in Helsinki. The current Hungarian ambassador to Finland is H.E. Klára Breuer

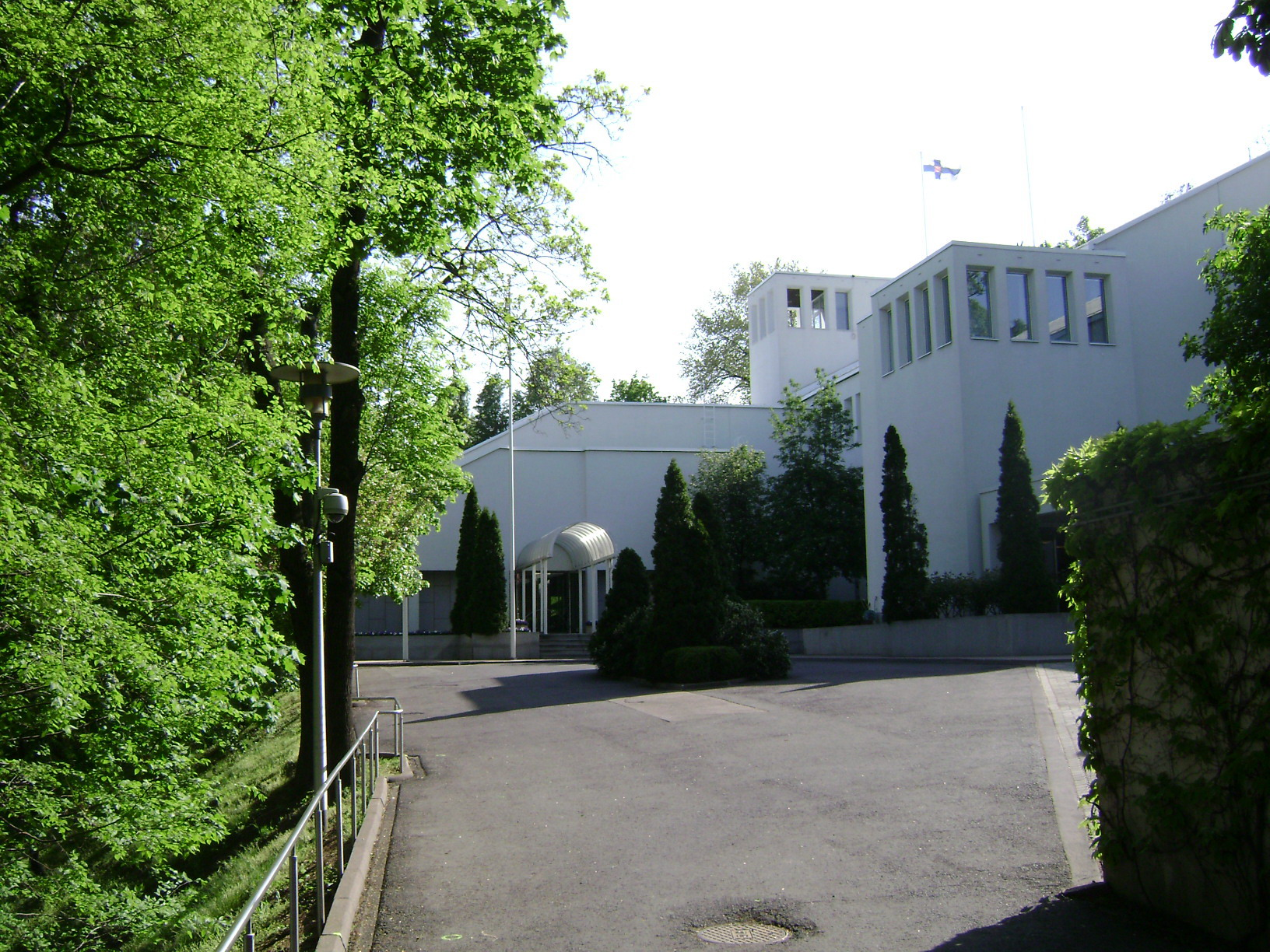
Finnish Embassy in Budapest

== See also ==
- Foreign relations of Finland
- Foreign relations of Hungary
- Hungarians in Finland
