= Colloquial Finnish =

Spoken form of the Finnish language

Colloquial or spoken Finnish (suomen puhekieli) is the unstandardized spoken variety of the Finnish language, in contrast with the standardized form of the language (yleiskieli). It is used primarily in personal communication and varies somewhat between the different dialects.

This article focuses on the variety of spoken Finnish that is predominant in the Helsinki metropolitan area and urbanized areas in the Tavastian and Central Finland dialectal areas, such as the cities of Tampere, Jyväskylä, Lahti, Hyvinkää, and Hämeenlinna – as well as in coastal cities such as Vaasa and Porvoo, which have been traditionally Swedish-speaking and have experienced an influx of Finnish speakers from a variety of dialectal areas.

The standard language takes most of its features from these dialects, i.e. most "dialectal" features are reductions with respect to this form of language. The combination of the common spoken Finnish and a dialect gives a regional variant (aluepuhekieli), which has some local idiosyncrasies but is essentially similar to the common spoken Finnish.

The basics of Finnish needed to fully understand this article can be found in pages about Finnish phonology and Finnish grammar.

== Introduction ==
As in any language, the spoken version(s) of Finnish often vary from the written form. Some of the latter's constructs are either too arbitrary (e.g. "soft d", cf. Finnish phonology), or too dialectal, e.g. hän (see below), for use in the spoken language. Furthermore, some very common and "accentless" sound changes are not reflected in the standard language, particularly fusion, liaison and some diphthong reductions.

There is also the problem that purists want to avoid irregularity regardless of actual usage. This has left some sound changes common in spoken language out from the standard language. There is a tendency to favor "more logical" constructs over easily pronounceable ones. This ideal does reflect spoken Finnish usage to a degree, as Finnish is demonstrably a conservative language with few reduction processes, but it is not entirely accurate. The problem of avoiding "irregularity" is most evident in spelling, where internal sandhi is not transcribed, because there is the idea that morphemes should be immutable. For example, the "correct" spelling is syönpä ("I eat" with emphasis), even though the pronunciation is usually syömpä. The explanation is that -n- and -pä are in different morphemes just like the explanation that English boys is not spelled with a z is that they are in different morphemes.

There are also a number of grammatical forms which are used in written Finnish, but only very rarely in spoken. For example, there are a number of constructions using participles which are usually rendered analytically in speech. Some cases and moods are rarely constructive in spoken Finnish, e.g. the instructive and comitative cases and the potential mood. Some survive only in expressions.

On the other hand, spoken language has its own features rarely or never found in formal language. Most importantly, there is very common external sandhi, and some assimilatory sound changes. (On the contrary, there is no vowel reduction.) In some variants (e.g. Vaasa, Kymenlaakso) of spoken Finnish -n kanssa ("with [something]") is abbreviated into a clitic that is effectively a comitative case, e.g. -nkans or -nkaa.

== Pronunciation ==
=== Reflexes of dental fricatives ===
The most common reflexes for old Finnish dental fricatives are /d/ for /ð/, and /ts/ or /t(ː)/ for /θ(ː)/. For example, metsä, metsän or mettä, metän ← meθθä, meθän "forest, of the forest" and meidän < meiðän "ours". Loss of /d/ also occurs, e.g. meiän. These are seen as "accent-free" pronunciations. Dialects generally have different reflexes — in fact, the different reflexes are used as a distinguishing feature between different dialects. For more details, see Finnish phonology.

=== Word-final n ===
One important sound change, which has gone to completion in Estonian but occurs idiosyncratically in Finnish, is mutation of word-final /n/ into a glottal stop /ʔ/, orthographically represented by an apostrophe. In some dialects, such as Savo, word-final /n/ is systematically replaced by /ʔ/, e.g. isä'iän ← isän ääni "father's voice". Both pronunciations can be heard in the Helsinki area. This means that the genitive/accusative form -n, which is very common in any form of Finnish, is simply noted by a glottal stop. However, this glottal stop undergoes sandhi whenever followed by consonant, or more often than not (see below).

=== Final vowels ===
Certain wordforms that end in /si/ in Standard Finnish occur without the word-final /i/ in the spoken language. This includes the base form of certain word stems as well as inflectional endings. In nouns this affects the translative case ending -ksi and the 2nd person singular possessive suffix -si. In verbs, loss of i affects the conditional mood ending -isi and, in certain verb inflection classes where it is preceded by an s, the preterite ending -i. These endings occur word-finally in 3rd person forms.

Final /i/ deletion
Written	Standard	Colloquial	Meaning	Inflected form of
anteeksi	/ˈɑnteːksi/	[ˈɑnteːks]	'sorry, excuse me'	–
yksi	/ˈyksi/	[yks]	'one'	–
kaksi	/ˈkɑksi/	[ˈkɑks]	'two'	–
uusi	/ˈuːsi/	[ˈuːs]	'new'	–
olisi	/ˈolisi/	[ˈolis]	'(s/he) would be'	olla 'to be'
palasi	/ˈpɑlɑsi/	[ˈpɑlɑs]	'your piece” '(s/he) returned'	pala 'piece' palata 'to return'
pääsi	/ˈpæːsi/	[ˈpæːs]	'your head' '(s/he) reached, was released'	pää 'head' päästä 'to reach, be released'

In many dialects loss of final i is commonplace not only in these cases but also elsewhere.

Particularly in Helsinki, deletion of /æ/ or /ɑ/, spelt «ä» and «a», respectively, in highly frequent words is common. This is a feature of Western Finnish dialects, found also in Savonian dialects and Estonian.

mutta — mut 'but'
kyllä — kyl 'yes'
-sta — -st elative case, 'out of / away from the inside of'

=== Vowel clusters and diphthongs ===
Word-final vowel clusters ending in /ɑ/ or /æ/ have much variation in dialects of Finnish. Especially in Helsinki they assimilate, where only the resulting chroneme marks the partitive in many words.

puhun suomea — puhun suomee "I speak Finnish"
pitkiä — pitkii "(some) long (things)"; partitive plural of pitkä, long

An /eɑ/ or /eæ/ cluster also appears in many adjectives:

pimeä — pimee "dark"

In other areas of Finland, these clusters may have a different fate. Another common dialectal variant is the raising of /e/ to /i/ in the adjectives: pimiä. (Partitives are unaffected by this.) Some rarer versions of this suffix include -jä / -ja, -ie, and even -ii.

Similar to the diphthongization of older */eː oː øː/ to /ie̯ uo̯ yø̯/ (unchanged in standard Estonian), many eastern dialects of Finnish diphthongize also the long vowels /ɑː æː/ to /oɑ̯ eæ̯/. In Savonian dialects, these have shifted further on to /uɑ̯ iæ̯/.

/ie̯ uo̯ yø̯/ can become /iː uː yː/ when in contact with another vowel. In many cases this results from colloquial deletion of /d/. For example:

- tiiän for standard tiedän "I know"
- viiä for standard viedä "to take away"
- lyyä for standard lyödä "to hit"
- tuua for standard tuoda "to bring"

=== Sandhi ===
A related phenomenon is the final consonant sandhi. When two words co-occur in the same prosodic unit, the consonant beginning the second word assimilates to the word-final consonant in the first word, creating a long consonant. This is not commonly written down, except in dialectal transcriptions. For example,

	Writing	Pronunciation	Meaning
Standard	Nyt se tulee!	/ˈnyt ˈse ˈtuleː/	“It's coming now”
Casual	Ny se tulee!	[ˈnysːe ˈtuleː]	“It's coming now”

== Personal pronouns ==
Some dialects have the full-length personal pronouns minä and sinä, but most people use shorter forms, like these found in the Helsinki metropolitan area region:

minä → mä
sinä → sä

Note: these do differ depending on where the speaker is from. For example minä can also be mie, miä, mää etc.

The root words are also shorter:

minu- → mu-, e.g. minun → mun "my"
sinu- → su-, e.g. sinun → sun "yours"

The third-person pronouns hän ('he', 'she', singular 'they') and he (plural 'they'), are rarely used in the spoken language outside of Southwestern Finland and are getting rare there, as well. Elsewhere, they are usually replaced by se and ne, which in the standard language do not refer to people.

hän → se
he → ne

For example, the sentence "Did he mistake me for you?" has these forms:

Luuliko hän minua sinuksi?
Luuliks se mua suks? or Luulikse mua suks?

Similarly, non-personal demonstrative pronouns are often used in place of hän or he, meaning people may be referred to as 'that' and 'those'. This also does not carry any pejorative meaning. The words are also changed from their written form.

hän → tuo → toi
he → nuo → noi

For example, when pointing out a culprit, the sentence "He broke it." has these forms:

Hän rikkoi sen.
Tuo rikko sen. or Toi rikko sen.

== Numerals ==
Numerals 1–10 in colloquial spoken Finnish:

1. yks (yksi)
2. kaks (kaksi)
3. kolme (kolme)
4. neljä (neljä)
5. viis (viisi)
6. kuus (kuusi)
7. seittemä(n) (seitsemän)
8. kaheksa(n) (kahdeksan)
9. yheksä(n) (yhdeksän)
10. kymmene(n) (kymmenen)

Numbers 11-19 are formed by appending -toista, which can be shortened to -toist. Numbers 20-90 are formed by appending -kymmentä, which can be shortened to -kymment or even -kyt(ä). Kolme, neljä and seittemän can be abbreviated to kol-, nel- and seit- with -kytä, but not independently, as in kolkytäkolme "33" or seitkytäneljä "74".

When counting out loud, even shorter forms are used, mostly one-syllable words with long vowels:

1. yy
2. kaa
3. koo
4. nee
5. vii
6. kuu
7. sei / see
8. kas(i)
9. ys(i)
10. kymp(pi)

-toista becomes -toi, -too or even -to. -kymmentä becomes -kyt, with 20-60 typically retaining their longer numeral forms (e.g. kakskyt rather than *kaakyt for 20). 70 is typically seitkyt or seiskyt, while 80 and 90 do with kasi- and ysi-.

The numerals 1–9 have their own names, different from the cardinal numbers used in counting. Numbers that have longer names are often shortened in speech. This may be problematic for a foreigner to understand, if they have learnt words by book:

ykkönen (number one)
kakkonen (number two)
kolmonen (number three)
nelonen (number four)
viitonen (number five) → vitonen, femma (Helsinki slang)
kuutonen (number six) → kutonen
seitsemäinen (number seven) → seiska
kahdeksainen / kahdeksikko (number eight) → kasi / kaheksikko
yhdeksäinen / yhdeksikkö (number nine) → ysi / yheksikkö
kymmenen → kymppi, kybä (Helsinki slang)

The -kko suffix normally denotes a group of x people, but on 8 and 9, it doubles as a synonym for the numeral's name. Kahdeksikko is also used to describe a figure eight shape.

The regular -Onen / -inen forms can additionally be used of objects with an ID number. For example, bus 107 is called sataseiska, and a competition winner is an ykkönen (not *sataseittemän or *yks.)

== Verbs ==
=== Pronoun usage ===
Personal pronouns are used extensively in spoken Finnish whereas in formal forms the pronoun is often optional (indicated in brackets in this article). Furthermore, the pronouns themselves in spoken Finnish are different from those used in formal Finnish.

Personal pronouns mä and sä are used extensively in colloquial Finnish in place of minä and sinä ('I' and singular 'you'). The pronouns se and ne, which in the formal language are used only as non-human personal pronouns meaning ('it' and plural 'they'), are used in the spoken language as personal pronouns (which in the formal language would be hän ('he', 'she' and singular 'they') and he (plural 'they').

See the tables below for examples.

=== Verb forms ===
One striking difference between colloquial Finnish and formal Finnish is use of the passive form in the first person plural. Thus for example:

Olemme Helsingissä (formal language)

Me ollaan Helsingissä (colloquial Finnish)

We're in Helsinki

Another is that the third person plural suffix -vat or -vät is not used in the spoken language; instead, the third person singular form is used with plural meaning being conveyed by the pronoun ne (they)

Therefore, the full present-tense paradigm of puhua "to speak" in everyday speech is:

mä puhun (spoken) — (minä) puhun (standard)
sä puhut — (sinä) puhut
se puhuu — hän puhuu
me puhutaa(n) — (me) puhumme
te puhutte — (te) puhutte
ne puhuu — he puhuvat

Some e-stem verbs have abbreviated (irregular) oblique forms, where /n/ or /l/ is elided. This class includes only four frequently used verbs. In Finnish, verbs have an infinitive form, marked with -ta and used in the infinitive, and an oblique form, which is used in personal forms. Consonant gradation and assimilation of the 't' in -ta may be applied. In the standard language, the correspondence between the two is always regular. In spoken language, some verbs have assimilated oblique forms, while retaining the regular infinitive:

engl.	I inf.	oblique stem	irreg. stem
be	olla	ole-	oo-
come	tulla	tule-	tuu-
go	mennä	mene-	mee-
put	panna	pane-	paa-

For example, these forms, as such, are represented by the imperatives:

Mene tai tule, mutta pane se ovi kiinni ja ole hiljaa (standard)
Mee tai tuu, mut paa se ovi kii ja oo hiljaa. (word-by-word) "Go or come, but put the door closed and be quiet."

To demonstrate the use of the personal form, the reply is:

Meen tai tuun, paan oven kii ja oon hiljaa ("I go or come, (I) put the door closed and (I) am quiet").

The infinitives are unchanged, as in:

Mennä tai tulla, panna ovi kii ja olla hiljaa ("To go or to come, to put the door closed and to be quiet").

As are participles, despite their using the oblique stem:

menevä tai tuleva, oven kii paneva ja hiljaa oleva ("Going or coming, door closed-putting and quiet-being").

The 't' at the end of participles ending -nut, -rut, -lut, -sut (or -nyt etc.) is often dropped when no consonant follows, or replaced by gemination of the following consonant:

minä en puhunut (formal)

mä en puhunu (colloquial)

I didn't speak

but:

mä en puhunu kenellekään (colloquial)

I didn't speak to anyone

is actually pronounced as if it were:

mä en puhunuk kenellekkään (with examples of gemination)

In the formal language some pronouns are considered optional, but in spoken language the pronoun is usually enunciated but may be optional when answering questions (which puts the person in the proper context).

Menemme Ouluun or Me menemme Ouluun ("We are going to Oulu") (formal language)
Me mennään Ouluun ("We are off to Oulu") (informal language)

In the latter example, dropping me would change the meaning from a statement to a suggestion:

Mennään Ouluun ("Let's go to Oulu") (informal or spoken language suggestion)

Compare the conjugation of OLLA in the formal language (Table 1) and in the spoken or colloquial language (Table 2). Table 2 shows in highlights the areas where there are differences in the structures between formal and informal. Optional pronouns are in brackets. English equivalent is in Table 3.

			TABLE 1 indicative mood of OLLA (to be) in the "formal" or "written" style							
active voice			present tense		imperfect		perfect		pluperfect	
per.	no.	pron.	affirmative	negative	affirmative	negative	affirmative	negative	affirmative	negative
1st	sg.	(minä)	olen	en ole	olin	en ollut	olen ollut	en ole ollut	olin ollut	en ollut ollut
2nd	sg.	(sinä)	olet	et ole	olit	et ollut	olet ollut	et ole ollut	olit ollut	et ollut ollut
3rd	sg.	hän	on	ei ole	oli	ei ollut	on ollut	ei ole ollut	oli ollut	ei ollut ollut
1st	pl.	(me)	olemme	emme ole	olimme	emme olleet	olemme olleet	emme ole olleet	olimme olleet	emme olleet olleet
2nd	pl.	(te)	olette	ette ole	olitte	ette olleet	olette olleet	ette ole olleet	olitte olleet	ette olleet olleet
3rd	pl.	he	ovat	eivät ole	olivat	eivät olleet	ovat olleet	eivät ole olleet	olivat olleet	eivät olleet olleet
passive voice			ollaan	ei olla	oltiin	ei oltu	on oltu	ei ole oltu	oli oltu	ei ollut oltu

			TABLE 2 indicative mood of OLLA (to be) in the "informal" or "spoken" style							
active voice			present tense		imperfect		perfect		pluperfect	
per.	no.	pron.	affirmative	negative	affirmative	negative	affirmative	negative	affirmative	negative
1st	sg.	mä	oon	en oo	olin	en ollu	oon ollu	en oo ollu	olin ollu	en ollu ollu
2nd	sg.	sä	oot	et oo	olit	et ollu	oot ollu	et oo ollu	olit ollu	et ollu ollu
3rd	sg.	se	on	ei oo	oli	ei ollu	on ollu	ei oo ollu	oli ollu	ei ollu ollu
1st	pl.	me	ollaan	ei olla	oltiin	ei oltu	ollaan oltu	ei olla oltu	oltiin oltu	ei oltu oltu
2nd	pl.	te	ootte	ette oo	olitte	ette ollu	ootte ollu	ette oo ollu	olitte ollu	ette ollu ollu
3rd	pl.	ne	on	ei oo	oli	ei ollu	on ollu	ei oo ollu	oli ollu	ei ollu ollu
passive voice			ollaan	ei olla	oltiin	ei oltu	on oltu	ei ole oltu	oli oltu	ei oltu oltu

			TABLE 3 indicative mood To BE in the informal English style							
active voice			present tense		imperfect		perfect		pluperfect	
per.	no.	pron.	affirmative	negative	affirmative	negative	affirmative	negative	affirmative	negative
1st	sg.	I	'm	'm not	was	wasn't	've been	haven't been	'd been	hadn't been
2nd	sg.	You	're	aren't/ain't	were	weren't	've been	've not been	'd been	hadn't been
3rd	sg.	s/he it	's	isn't	was	wasn't	's been	hasn't been	'd been	hadn't been
1st	pl.	We	're	aren't	were	weren't	've been	've not been	'd been	hadn't been
2nd	pl.	You	're	aren't/ain't	were	weren't	've been	've not been	'd been	hadn't been
3rd	pl.	They	're	aren't	were	weren't	've been	've not been	'd been	hadn't been

== Questions ==
In everyday speech, the -ko/kö suffix has the -s clitic added, becoming -kos/kös, which in turn reduces to -ks:

olenko minä hengissä? → oo(n)ks mä hengis? "am I alive?"
puhutko sinä englantia? → puhut sä enkkuu? or puhuks(ä) enkkuu? "do you (sg.) speak English?"
tuliko hän jo? → tulikse jo? (via tulikos se jo?) "did he/she come yet?"

The choice of morphemes -kos/kös or -ks is not always purely dialectal or accidental. Many Finns regularly use more than one variation in their speech. The choice might depend among others on the rhythm of the sentence or the (wished) tempo of the discussion. Sometimes it has other clearly communicational purposes e.g. the longer variation might be used to soften an intruding question.

The clitic -s is also found in imperatives, e.g. me(n)es "(I expect you to) go!" It can also be, that the -tkö elides not to -ks, but -t before a 's', e.g. menetkö sä ? me(n)et sä. Because this is identical to sä menet except for the word order, questions are indicated by word order.

== Possessive suffix ==
Spoken language has a different grammar for the possessive suffix. In contrast to the literary language, the suffix is optional and typically omitted. Compare English in which, e.g., "The house to which this door belongs" would be the correct written form even though "the house whose door this is" would be the more common spoken version.

Formal	Spoken	English
(minun) taloni	mun talo	my house
(sinun) talosi	sun talo(s)/talos	your (sg) house
(hänen) talonsa	sen talo/talonsa	his/her house
(meidän) talomme	meiän talo	our house
(teidän) talonne	teiän talo	your (pl) house
(heidän) talonsa	niitten/niien talo/talonsa	their house

Here, the pronoun of the literary form is also shown.

Notice that Finnish has no possessive adjectives. The pronouns are regularly inflected, like if "I's house", "you's house", "we's house".

However, the suffixes -s, -nsa and -nne are used to avoid repeating a pronoun, e.g. "He took his hat and left" is Se otti lakkinsa ja lähti. (The translation from English *Se otti sen lakin ja lähti would mean "He took his/her hat and left" or "He took the (specific) hat and left").

== Omission of the negative verb ==
When a negative sentence is formed, the main verb goes into the connegative form, which is identical to the imperative mood, and gives all of its inflections to the negative verb ei, e.g. tuemme → emme tue. Usually the word mitään ("anything") and an expletive is added to the sentence. This means that even if the negative verb ei is left out, the meaning is indicated by this context. For example:

Ei se mitään osaa. "He doesn't know anything."
Se mitään osaa. "He know anything." ("doesn't" omitted)

This omission of the negative verb ei is considered one of the most recent changes in Finnish. Usually this construction indicates mistrust or frustration. (A parody article by Jaakko Häkkinen calls this aggressiivi, see aggressive mood.) However, it can be a neutral negative statement: Tästä artikkelista mitään opi (From this article, ~~you don't~~ learn anything).

== Regional variation ==
Linguists such as Mielikäinen argue that the dialects of Finnish have been considerably homogenized by 20th century developments of urbanization and other internal population movements to the point that "pure" dialects have disappeared. "Local spoken languages" have developed from standard Finnish to give variety with essentially standard Finnish structure but with some local features. Considerable stigma has been associated with dialects (accurately or not) perceived as rural in the 20th century. People who have moved to the city have adopted a variety resembling standard Finnish, which has been imposed upon dialect speakers by the school, the military and the employers.

Breaking up some consonant clusters on syllable boundaries with an epenthetic vowel is a feature of several dialects, such as South Ostrobothnian dialect and Savo dialects: The neutral vowel is the same as the preceding vowel. For example, juhla → juhula "celebration", salmi → salami "strait", palvelu → palavelu "service", halpa → halapa "cheap", äffä → ähävä (via ähvä) "letter F". Pairs of dissimilar consonants with /l/ or /h/ (in Savo, also /n/) as the first consonant are subject to epenthesis; other clusters or geminates are not. However, a strong epenthetic vowel is seen as dialectal, and in Helsinki and urbanized areas, indicates origins "in the countryside" (since for Helsinki people, everything but Helsinki is rural).

=== Tavastian dialects ===
Tavastian dialects are diverse because other, surrounding dialects have influenced them. The following features are all found in Finnish spoken in Helsinki, and many of them occur also in some other Tavastian dialects.

- Word sillai "in that way", which is usually something else like silleen elsewhere.
- Partitive plurals ending -ja/-jä in generic Finnish become -i, and likewise the partitive plural -ia/-iä simplifies to -ii: märkiä takkeja → märkii takkei "wet jackets". (also in Nurmijärvi, Kotka)
- The first infinitive, e.g. juosta "to run", is replaced by the third-person form juoksee "runs" by some speakers. For example, standard Voisitko sinä juosta hakemaan sen becomes Voisitsä juoksee hakeen sen "Could you run to get it". This form is probably historically speaking not the third-person form, but the colloquial, shortened form juokseen of the third infinitive form juoksemaan, which exhibits a tendency to oust the first infinitive even in the formal language, cf. the old dispute, whether alkaa juoksemaan ("to start running") should be allowed in the formal language or not (the current norm is still alkaa juosta with the first infinitive). (also in Tuusula and Nurmijärvi)
- Abbreviations are common in Finnish spoken in the Southern coast of Finland. Final syllables in frequently used words may erode, like sitten → sit, mutta → mut. Case endings might be abbreviated, usually by the loss of the final vowel, e.g. siltä → silt. (If a geminate would be "left dangling" at the end of the word, it becomes a single consonant, e.g. talossa → *taloss → talos.)
- Helsinki also has a local slang, containing foreign loanwords which may be unintelligible to people from other parts of Finland. Some slang words have spread to the spoken language of youngsters elsewhere in Finland.
- Tampere is also in the area of Tavastian dialects.
  - Occasional flapping or deletion of intervocalic "L"; the resulting sound is orthographically nil: kyllä siellä olisi → kyä siä ois. This is seen even in the accentless form oisko ← standard olisiko.

=== North and South Karelia ===
- Personal pronouns: minä → mie, sinä → sie, hän → hää, me → myö, te → työ, he → hyö
  - Notice: se and ne don't change to syö or nyö respectively and hää and hyö are more commonly used than se and ne unlike in the standard colloquial language where hän and he are replaced with the non-personal equivalents
  - The declined forms also vary, for example minua can be minnuu, minuu or miuta depending on the regional dialect
- Vowel epenthesis in North Karelia: kolme → kolome, selvä → selevä
- In some Karelian dialects the end of participles ending -nut or -nyt and -lut drop the vowel instead of 't': puhunut → puhunt, käynyt → käynt, katsonut → katsont/kattont, mennyt → ment/mänt, ollut → olt, tullut → tult
- Some Karelian (and Savonian) dialects also use the exessive case: kotoa → kotont(a), ulkoa → ulkont(a), siitä → siint(ä)
- The North Karelian dialect is a subset of the Savonian dialects, while the South Karelian dialect is a unique Finnish dialect.

=== Southwestern dialects ===
- Abbreviation occurs very often.
- In Turku: minä → mää, sinä → sää
- A unique characteristic of Turku dialect is the "S" imperfect tense, which has the ending -si instead of -i, e.g., sattusi for sattui.

=== Savonia ===
- Some difference in pronouns, myö, työ for me, te. Notice that the Savo dialect has complicated differences in grammar, vowels and consonants compared to the standard language, e.g. öylen for eilen, mänj for meni, omaa rataansa → ommoo rattoosa. The Savo dialect is the largest single dialect, and as such, has variants that differ significantly.

=== Ostrobothnia ===
- Consonant clusters with -j- are not allowed, so that a -i- is pronounced instead, e.g. kirja → kiria. The sound /d/ is completely replaced with a rhotic consonant r, either a trill /r/, or a flap /ɾ/, which produces problems such as that there is no or almost no contrast between veden (of water) and veren (of blood). For speakers with the flap, there remains a small difference, not generally audible for outsiders. Usually context can be relied on to distinguish the word.
- Minor vowel changes, for example, taloa → talua. In Southern Ostrobotnia, in unstressed syllables old diphthongs ending in i are reflected as long vowels, e.g. punainen → punaanen. In some words, where the diphthong has been lost from the standard language, this results in seemingly unmotivated long vowels, e.g. iso → isoo.
- Vaasa, Ostrobothnia, to an extent generic Finnish, too: Many frequently used expressions become clitics - this is optional, though. E.g. pronouns become clitics for the negative verb ei and for the verb "to be". In this table, the apostrophe (') is something between a full J and no sound at all.

Written	Spoken	Written example	Spoken example
minä	m'	minä olen, minä en, minä en ole	moon, mäen, mäen o
sinä	s'	sinä olet, sinä et, sinä et ole	soot, säet, säet o
hän	s'	hän on, hän ei, hän ei ole	son, sei, sei'oo
me	m'	me olemme, me emme, me emme ole	mollaan, mei, mei'olla
te	t'	te olette, te ette, te ette ole	tootte, tette, tette oo
he	n'	he ovat, he eivät, he eivät ole	noon, nei, nei'oo

- Additionally, in the Southwest, the interrogative pronoun kuka ("who") is replaced by its partitive form, ketä ("whom"), e.g. Ketä siellä oli? ("Who was there?") Other differences in case for interrogative words are mihinä (std. missä, "where") and mihkä (std. mihin, "into where").

== See also ==
- List of phonetics topics
