= Eyecatcher =

Eyecatcher may refer to:

- Eyecatcher (landscape), an object used to decorate a landscape
- Eyecatcher (television), a short scene or illustration used to begin and end a commercial break in a Japanese television show
