= Swedish profanity =

Profanity in Swedish

Swedish profanity can be divided into several categories. A substantial number of curse words in Swedish have religious origins. Euphemistic variants of the religious curses are commonly used as well. References to genitalia or bodily functions are common in the Swedish profanity vocabulary. Notably, no word for sexual intercourse is commonly used in invectives, unlike many other languages (e.g., English fuck, Spanish joder, Mandarin cào / 肏/操, Portuguese Foda). However, calques of English fuck using knull (noun), knulla (verb) do occur; this comes across as more offensive than fuck does in English. In general, knull(a), along with genitalia slang words like kuk ('cock') and fitta ('cunt') are the most offensive single words. By contrast, most of the traditional religious profanities are not considered very offensive today; this is in line with Sweden's long-standing secularism.

Some commonly used profanity is borrowed from other languages, such as English: Shit vad snygg hon är ('Damn, she looks good'), German: Det var en scheissefilm ('That was a crappy movie'), and Finnish: Perkele! (the latter usually for comic effect). An overt attitude expressed regarding this phenomenon may be that some Swedish speakers find the native profanities lacking the required 'punch'; again this might be related to the perceived ineffectiveness of the traditional religious profanities; borrowing allows speakers to avoid the much more offensive native sexual vocabulary.

Other common English-origin profanities used are bitch and fuck. Such words are often rendered in a more-or-less diligent English pronunciation, suggesting code-switching, though more assimilated Swedish approximations, [ɕitː] for shit, [fakː] for fuck, are also common. More humorous is spelling pronunciation of fuck as [fɵkː], but the verb fucka upp, calqued on fuck up, and its participle uppfuckad, for fucked up, usually have the spelling pronunciation.

Commonly used as euphemisms are certain numerals, especially sjutton ('seventeen'; phonologically reminiscent of satan and skit), and variant form tusan from tusen ('thousand'; reminiscent of satan), plus nonsense numerals used as intensifiers like femtielva ('fifty-eleven').

== Intelligence profanities ==
Idiot (noun), idiotisk (adj.)
Meaning "idiot", "idiotic".

Puckad (adj.), pucko (noun)
Derogatory slang for "stupid person". The etymology is uncertain; one hypothesis derives it from puck "hockey puck", as in being hit on the head with one.

IQ-befriad (adj.)
Devoid of IQ.

Efterbliven (adj.)
Retarded.

Blåst (adj.)
"Blown-out", meaning an empty head.

CP (noun, adj.)
Versatile insult referring to cerebral palsy.

== Sexual profanities ==
Bög
Lit. "bugger, faggot", male homosexual. Combined with jävel (see below) to yield the very offensive bögjävel ("fucking faggot"). The word bög by itself is reappropriated by the Swedish gay community and is today considered neutral or somewhat positive.

Fitta
Pussy, vagina, vulva, but not used as the English "pussy" meaning coward, rather "trecherous". Etymologically, it means "wetland, swamp".

Fjolla
"Faggot, gay", but more generally used for feminine men.

Knapsu
Men who act like women, who do feminine chores. Used only in the North.

Torsk

"Sex-buyer, john" (lit. "codfish").

Hora
Lit. "whore". Compound horunge means "child of a whore".

Slampa, slyna, luder
Bitch, slut, promiscuous woman.

Lebb
"Lesbian, dyke". Blend of lesbisk ("lesbian") and läbbig ("icky").

Knulla (verb), knull (noun)
Lit. "(to) fuck", but less commonly used and more offensive than fuck in English. The verb can be used both intransitively (e.g. dom knullar "they're screwing") and transitively (mostly of males, e.g. han knullar henne "he's screwing her").

Kåt (adj), kåta upp (verb)
"Horny"; the verb (with stressed verbal particle) is causative, meaning "to make horny", and from it is formed a passive participle uppkåtad which also means "horny" but with an inchoative nuance. Etymologically, kåt is an example of pejoration, as the Icelandic cognate kátur simply means "glad".

Sätta på
Vulgar phrasal verb with stress on the verbal particle, meaning "to bang, screw" in transitive use (usually said of males). The phrase can also be used in the non-vulgar sense "to turn on (a device)", a source of sexual innuendos.

== Religious profanities ==
Fan
A name for the Devil. May be pronounced as a disyllabic for emphasis: Faan! ['fa:.an], Faen!. Used interjectively, Va' fan? ("What the hell?"), Fan ta dig!, ("Goddamn you!", lit. "[may] the Devil take you!"). The derived word fanskap is also used: Vad har hon nu hittat på för fanskap? ("What devilry is she up to now?"). The taboo deformation in Dra åt fanders! (Get lost!) is increasingly becoming old-fashioned, but still commonly used are:

- fanken
- fasen
- fasiken
- farao "pharaoh"

Förbannad, förbannat
Lit. "cursed, damned". Used interjectively, as Förbannat! ("damn!") or as an intensifier: Var inte så förbannat dum! ("Don't be so damned stupid"). An alternative meaning is "angry": jag blev förbannad på henne ("I got pissed off at her"). Taboo deformations include:

- förbaskat
- förbenat
- förbålt

Helvete
Lit. "hell". Used similarly to the English "hell", such as in the phrase Dra/Far or Stick åt helvete! ("Go to hell!") and Vad i helvete? ("What the hell?"). Also common is för i helvete, "for fuck's sake". Taboo deformations are:

- Helsike
- Helskotta
- Hälsingland (referring to the province of Hälsingland, but introduced due to similar sounding to Helsike).

Herregud
Lit. "Lord God". A relatively mild profanity used to express dismay or surprise, similar to "oh, my God!" Contracted with jävlar it becomes the cruder and more offensive herrejävlar.
Jisses, jösses
Taboo deformations for Jesus. As an interjection, an expression of amazement or surprise: Jisses! ("Yikes!"), Jösses, vad du har blivit stor ("Geez, you've grown!").
Jävel, djävel.
Colloquial versions of djävul, lit. "devil". A versatile word, used in many ways as the English "fuck". The plural is frequently used as an interjection, Jävlar! ("Fuck!" or "Damn it!"), sometimes extended Jä-ä-ävlar-r-r-r for extra emphasis. Most commonly used pejoratively, as in din jävel! ("You fucker!"), but can also be used admiringly, as in han var en snabb jävel ("He was a quick son-of-a-bitch"). The word can also be used adjectivally: den jävla hunden bet mig! ("The fucking dog bit me!"). The derived form jävlig can mean "irritating", "troublesome": jag haft en jävlig dag. ("I've had a rough day"); also common with intensifying prefix förjävlig, as in jag mår förjävligt "I feel like shit". A more comic effect can be rendered by traditional adjective djävulsk "devilish", or its expressive variant djävulusisk. Jävla also derived a deponent verb jävlas "to be a jerk": Han jävlas med mig means "He's yanking my chain/fucking with me". Commonly used taboo deformations for jävel or jävla include:

- jädra
- jäkla
- jämra - lit. "moan"
- bövel(en), bövlar - originally bödel "hangman" blending with jävel

One group of taboo deformations, less commonly used today, substitutes words beginning with järn- ("iron"):

- järnspikar: "iron nails"
- järnvägar: "railways"

Satan
Literally, an invocation of Satan. Used as an interjection Satan! and also in the genitive form: Den satans katten har pissat i rabatten igen ("The goddamn cat has pissed in the flowerbed again"). Taboo deformation:

- sablar: "sabers". Backformed into attributive adjective sabla (like jävla from jävlar), e.g. sabla skit "fucking shit".

The religious profanities are often combined in tirades for extra emphasis or for comedic effect: satans helvetes förbannade jävla fan.

== Scatological ==
piss
Lit. "piss, urine". Frequently used as an interjection to express dismay or disappointment, Piss också! ("Damn it!"). Used as a prefix it intensifies the head: det var pissenkelt ("It was really easy"), Jag mår pissdåligt ("I feel like shit").
skit
Lit. "shit". When used interjectively it is much less offensive than its English cognate: Skit! ("Damn!"). Commonly used for "filth", "mess": hon var skitig ("She was dirty"). As a verb, skita means "to defecate", as in: Han sket på sig ("He's shit himself" or "He shat his pants.") but also "to make dirty": Han skitade ner sig ("He got dirty"). Combined with the preposition i ("in") changes the meaning to "ignore", "not care": Det skiter jag i! ("I don't give a damn!"). Commonly used as an emphasizing prefix: skitbillig ("dirt cheap"), skitfull ("dead drunk") and as a diminishing prefix: Det är en skitsak ("It's a piece of cake"). In imperative mood, skit på dig! (lit. "shit yourself!") is used like "get bent" or "get lost" in English. The extremely common word skit is increasingly losing its literal sense and offensive character in many of its uses, to the point of becoming a placeholder noun, e.g. det ligger nån skit på bordet means "there is some stuff on the table"; likewise the verbal construction skita i is the usual colloquial expression for "never mind, not care about, skip" with little or no scatological connotations, e.g. han sket i efterrätten "he skipped dessert"; in the use of offensive, scatological profanity it is sometimes replaced by child-language bajs and verb bajsa.
skitstövel
Lit. "shit-boot". Similar in offensiveness to "asshole", "fucker", or "bastard". Originally a derogatory term for peasants, implying their boots are stained with manure (compare with "shit-kicker").
kräk
Derived from the Swedish words for vomit and vomiting (kräk, kräkas). Used similarly to the English "asshole".

== Body parts ==
arsel, arsle
Lit. "arsehole". Used pejoratively about people: Vilket arsle han är! ("What an arsehole he is!"). Occasionally used less offensively to refer to somebody's posterior.
fitta (compounding form fitt-)
Lit. "cunt". Used pejoratively about females: Hon är en riktig fitta. ("She's a real bitch").
kuk
Lit. "cock, dick". Used interjectively to express annoyance (Kuk!). Combined with huvud ("head") yields kukhuvud ("dickhead").
röv, rövhål
Lit. "arse, arsehole". Commonly used in the expression Ta dig i röven! ("Up yours!", lit. "grab your ass!").
snorunge
Small child or behaving like a child; little brat; literally "snot kid".

== Ableist slurs ==
mongo (adj. and noun)
Slang term derived from mongolism; the meaning is "retard" or "weirdo". Can be added to anything, such as "borrmongo" (someone who incessantly renovates their home).

särbarn, sär
Offensive slang term meaning approximately "retard". From särskola, the Swedish term for special education. The prefix sär- is at least partly short for särskild "special", but also means "apart, segregated". Children receiving special education are särskolebarn, which as a general invective shortened to särbarn, with connotations of "segregated, institutionalized"; this in turn backformed into adjectival noun sär, e.g. ditt jävla sär! "you fucking retard!".

cp
Usually pronounced [ˈseːpeː]. Offensive slang term derived from the abbreviation for cerebral pares "cerebral palsy" and meaning approximately "retard". Can be used as a derogatory prefix, e.g. jävla cp-cykel "fucking shitty bike". Also in combination with -barn ie child, "cp-barn".

damp (Noun), dampa (verb)
Abbreviated form of the formerly diagnosed neuropsychiatric condition called Deficits in attention, motor control and perception. Implies erratic or unusual behavior, especially hyperactivity and aggression. Can be used as a verb, e.g han dampar "he is freaking out".

missfoster, miffo
Missfoster (from miss- "mis-" and foster "fetus") is an offensive term for "(the result of) miscarriage, a freak". Miffo is in origin a slang truncation, but nowadays the connection is more or less lost, and miffo has the more mild sense of "weirdo".

efterbliven, utvecklingsstörd
Offensive adjectives, meaning "retarded", e.g. Han är så jävla efterbliven! "He's so fucking retarded!". Utvecklingsstörd is often shortened to störd lit. "disturbed".

== Animal invectives ==
Note that "dog" does not commonly figure as an offensive profanity, with expressions like din hund! "you dog!" being understood as jocular or archaizing.

Nöt
Old term for cattle, today occurring almost exclusively in compounds and in the sense "beef", other than as a rather mild insult meaning "stupid". This word is neuter gender, unlike homophone nöt "nut" (with which it is often associated synchronically). Thus in the insult ditt nöt! the second person form is in the neuter.

Kossa
"Cow", using a lengthened form of the basic ko.

Pippa; göka
Both meaning "to fuck". Pippi is child language for "bird". Gök means "cuckoo".

Höns-
Compound form of höna "hen". Used to form mild invectives meaning "stupid", e.g. hönshjärna, lit. "hen brain".

Apa, ap-
"Ape, monkey", with the connotation "stupid" or "brutish". Frequent in compounds like aphjärna, lit. "ape brain". Also in expressions smaka/lukta apa "taste/smell like shit".

Kåtbock
"Horny buck", i.e. "a man who is horny as a goat".

Gris
"Pig", implying filthy or disgusting habits.

Svin
Swine, implying either dirtiness or evil conduct.

== Death ==
Gå och dö
Lit. "go and die", i.e. "go kill yourself".

As
Lit. "carrion". Common derogatory term meaning approximately "jackass". Also common as an intensifying prefix, e.g. asbra "really good".

Lik
Lit. "corpse", derogatory term for seniors.

== Ethnic and political slurs ==
Pejoratives relating to ethnicity, occupation or political views often have the suffix -e.

bonne (noun), bonnig (adj.)
"Yokel, redneck", derived from bonde "peasant, farmer".

neger
"Negro"; further, blåneger lit. "blue negro" refers to a person with a very deep black skin colour (cf. Blåland, the Old Swedish name for Africa). Commonly called n-ordet ("n-word").

blatte
Derogatory term for immigrants of non-Swedish ethnicity in Sweden, especially those with a darker skin colour.

shlajftorsk
Addicted to cocaine.

svenne
Derogatory word for people of Swedish ethnicity, or those behaving in a stereotypically Swedish manner, especially used by immigrants.

svartskalle
"Black head", derogatory term for people with dark skin or dark hair.

balubas
Used for black people or immigrants in the 1960s, no longer in use. Could also mean motorbike gangs or breasts.

turk
Derogatory term for immigrants of non-Swedish ethnicity, regardless of actual ethnicity. Can also be used as a prefix turk-.

jugge
Derogatory term for persons, especially immigrants, from the former Yugoslavia, derived from the Swedish version of the name "Jugoslavien".

reservdansk
Lit. "spare/reserve Dane, describes people from the southernmost province of Scania, which was once part of Denmark. Meant to imply that Scanians are more Danish than Swedish due to their geographical proximity to Denmark and due to shared traits between the Scanian dialects and the Danish language. Generally used jokingly in present day.

skäggbarn
Lit. "beard child", derogatory term for an adult male assuming the identity of a child, typically to receive extra perks as an asylum seeker.

sosse
Truncated from socialdemokrat. Someone who is a member or votes for the Swedish Social Democratic Party.

Borgarbracka
Bourgeois brat.

stekare
Rich brat, usually hanging around Stureplan in Stockholm.

nasse
Truncated from nazi, also being traditional slang for "pig". Can also be strengthened by adding -jävel (nassejävel) or -svin (nassesvin).

rasse
Truncated from rasist "racist".

musse
Truncated from muslim "muslim".

== Constructional and word formation patterns ==
Interjections are often constructed with a following också "too, also", e.g. fan också!, skit också!, helvete också!, somewhat like e.g. French zut alors!. Some can be preceded by fy "fie", especially fy fan!.

Some traditional profanities are commonly constructed as genitive attributes (using genitive suffix/enclitic -s) when used as an intensifier in combination with another profanity, e.g. helvetes skit lit. "hell's shit", satans helvete lit. "Satan's hell".

Second person personal pronouns in invectives are usually replaced by possessives: thus din idiot!, lit. "your idiot!", i.e. "you idiot!". Note that possessives agree with nouns in gender, thus din idiot in common gender, but ditt pucko in neuter.

Derogatory nouns and adjectives can be formed using semi-productive suffix -o, e.g. pucko, mongo, fyllo ("a drunk", from full "drunk", fylla "binge-drinking"), fetto ("a fatty", from fet "fat"), neggo (slang for "pessimist, kill-joy", from negativ "negative"), pervo ("pervert"). This is at least partly influenced by English formations in -o like wacko, weirdo, pervo.

Compounding is frequently used to coin novel profanities. Compounds of the bahuvrihi type, often involving body parts, can often be associated with insults, thus the relatively mild dumhuvud like English "dumbhead"; a more offensive example is svartskalle lit. "black-skull", ethnic slur for a dark-haired or dark-skinned person. The exact semantics of Swedish compounds is sometimes open to interpretation, and this may be utilized for comic effect, thus surfitta lit. "sour-cunt" may be understood either as "someone whose cunt is acidic" (thus a bahuvrihi compound) or "someone who is acidic like a cunt". The same ambiguity applies e.g. to kukhuvud, like English "dickhead". Sometimes, when an element can be used as derogatory or intensifying in either prefixed and suffixed positions, the relation between elements in the compound can be reversed with basically no change in meaning, e.g. idiotfitta and fittidiot combining "idiot" and "cunt".

One particular compounding construction takes the profanity as the head of the compound and the referent as the modifier: thus hundjävel means approximately "bloody dog", but the head of the compound is jävel, and hund "dog" is the modifier. This is often pleonastically modified with jävla, as jävla hundjävel "fucking bloody dog". Alternatively, this can be analyzed as a derivation with -jävel as a suffix. The formation is extremely productive and basically any concrete noun can be suffixed with -jävel, e.g. lådjävel "bloody box", kyrkjävel "bloody church" (note that the combining form for kyrka "church" is here kyrk- rather than traditional kyrko-). Other comparable morphemes that are more or less productive are -helvete (often abstract nouns), -äckel (for people; äckel means "disgust" or "disgusting person", cf. äcklig "disgusting"), -fan (often animals, as in älgfan "bloody moose"), -fitta (for women), -mongo.

A number of intensifying prefixes (or compounding modifiers, depending on grammatical analysis) are used more or less productively, e.g. skit- lit. "shit", rå- lit. "raw" (e.g. råpuckad "really stupid", råknulla "fuck very hard"), tok- lit. "crazy" (e.g. tokmongo "complete retard", tokknulla "fuck really wildly"), skogs- lit. "forest".

Some elements can be used either as attributive adjective or as compound first element, which is a marked accentual distinction in Swedish, to produce a subtle semantic difference, thus mongo hund or mongohund.
