= Negative verb =

Concept in linguistics

A negative verb or negative auxiliary is an auxiliary verb which negates the clause in which it occurs. Negative verbs are similar in function to English not, but unlike not (which is not a verb) a negative verb inflects for agreement with the subject. This can be seen in the following two examples from Finnish. In the affirmative sentence (1) agreement appears on the main verb syödä 'eat'. In the negative sentence (2) agreement appears on the negative verb ei and the main verb appears in a non-finite form.

sö-i-n omena-n
eat-PAST-1SG apple-ACC
'I ate an apple'

e-n syö-nyt omena-a
NEG-1SG eat-PTCP apple-PTV
'I did not eat an apple'

While the discussion of negative verbs is common in the context of Uralic languages like Finnish, they are known to occur in a variety of language families. For example, the Tungusic language Uilta (Orok) displays similar behavior to Finnish, only here the negative verb inflects both for subject agreement and tense:

tari nari ŋene-xe-ni
that man go-PAST-3SG
'He went'

tari nari ec-ci-ni ŋennee
that man NEG-PAST-3SG go.PTCP
'He did not go'

While not vanishingly rare, negative verbs are a relatively uncommon form of clausal negation in the world's languages. Most languages use some sort of negation particle (such as English not) or a verbal affix (such as the suffix -me in Turkish); still others use a combination two non-verbal markers (so-called double negation). Each of these three strategies is more common than negative verbs.

The main factor that distinguishes negative verbs from negative particles is that they display the morphological and syntactic properties of verbs. Thus, a negative verb should conjugate like a verb, displaying, for example, agreement and tense morphology in languages that have these features. They will also appear in syntactic positions associated with verbs. However, the morphology and syntax of some languages will not always make it possible to conclusively distinguish between negative verbs and negative particles.

== Uralic languages ==
Uralic languages differ from each other in the particulars of negation predicate use but continue to show specific similarities. For defining different patterns of negation predicates it is necessary to know about the lexical verb (LV) and the finite form (FE). Miestamo defined four types of asymmetry in negation verbs. The first type shows a prominent appearance in Uralic languages. It is defined as A/Fin (A = asymmetry | Fin = finiteness) and describes that influenced by the negation verb, the finiteness of the LV is reduced or lost. For example, the LV loses the finiteness because the clause is marked by the de-verbalizing negative morpheme. Therefore, the copula is added as a type that holds the finite status (FE). In some Uralic languages, speakers produce connegatives to construct the syntactically acceptable word form used in negative clauses.

=== Finnish ===
The standard negation (SN) in the Finnish language is realized by a verbal complex. First the LV with a non-finite character is formed followed by the finite element which is presented as the negative auxiliary. The root of the auxiliary is 'e-'. The ending gives information about person and number. The marker for tense is not presented on the auxiliary and is only dependent on the clausal context. Therefore, tense is marked on the LV separated from the auxiliary and appears as connegative form in present tense and past participle in past tense.

==== Negative Verb - Overview for clausal negations ====
| SN in main clauses | AUX(iliary) 'ei': 'e-' + Person/Number marking; Main verb: connegative or participle; Asymmetric |
| Non-verbal predicates | SN |
| Imperatives/Prohibitive sentences | AUX 'äl-' + idiosyncratic Person and mood marking |
| Negation in dependent clauses | Finite: SN |

Indicative, conditional, and potential

| Person | Singular | Plural |
|---|---|---|
| 1. | en | emme |
| 2. | et | ette |
| 3. | ei | eivät |

The verb to be negated is inflected in the same way for all these forms: en maalaa "I don't paint", et maalaa, ei maalaa, emme maalaa, ette maalaa, eivät maalaa, from maalata "to paint". This form is the same as for the third person singular. The passive is formed as ei maalata "is not painted".

Imperative

| Person | Singular | Plural |
|---|---|---|
| 1. | - | älkäämme |
| 2. | älä | älkää |
| 3. | älköön | älkööt |

The verb to be negated takes the form älä maalaa "do not paint" in the second person singular and the form with -ko in älköön maalatko, älkäämme maalatko, älkäätte maalatko, älkööt maalatko in other persons and numbers. The (rarely used) passive form is älköön maalattako. Colloquial Finnish more likely uses the construction ei saa maalata "it is not allowed to paint".

=== Estonian ===
The Estonian language uses a particle-like non-inflectional negative auxiliary which is hierarchically presented on a pre-verbal slot. The auxiliary is realized as 'ei'. A special form differs from the SN while forming the connegative in the present tense, in the past form, or in the active past participle. In the Estonian language, the fictional character doesn't seem to be a necessary feature for the negative auxiliary, which differs from other Uralic languages. This is important because the question appears, if the auxiliary has to show a flectional marker even if the LV is not showing any flectional marker without using the negation modus.

==== Negative Verb - Strategies in clausal negations ====
| Clausal SN; finite: indicative, conditional, evidental | 'ei-' (uninflected) + verb in connegative |
| Prohibitive sentences | 'ära' (inflected) + verb in connegative or inflected (variation) |
| Negation in locative, equative, inclusive, attributive constructions | 'ei' (uninflected) + copula in connegative |

Indicative, conditional, and oblique

| Person | Singular | Plural |
|---|---|---|
| 1. | ei | ei |
| 2. | ei | ei |
| 3. | ei | ei |

Imperative

| Person | Singular | Plural |
|---|---|---|
| 1. | - | ärgem; ärme |
| 2. | ära | ärge |
| 3. | ärgu | ärgu |

=== Skolt Saami ===
In Skolt Saami the SN shows a negative auxiliary compared with a non-finite LV. For imperative a special case is provided.

==== Negative Verb - Summary ====
| SN | Negation AUX: 'ij' + LV; Negation copula (replaces Positive copula) + verb |
| Negation of imperatives | Negation AUX + Imperative + verb |
| Negation of non-verbal predicates | -SN: Negation copula (general stative negator, alternative to SN) |
| Negation in dependent clauses | finite: SN; non-finite: verbal abessive |

=== South Saami ===
In South Saami, the SN is realized by a negative auxiliary. This form is used in present tense and the preterite. The LV is presented as a connegative form. A special case is presented while creating the imperative. In this case the negative auxiliary gets a full personal paradigm except for the third person 'dual'. The third person in singular in present tense of the negative auxiliary is prohibited as a negative reply.

==== Negative Verb - Strategies in clausal negations ====
| SN | Negative AUX + connegative verb |
| Imperative/prohibitive sentences | Negative AUX 'aell-' (prohibitive) + connegative verb; Negative AUX 'oll-' (apprehensive) + connegative verb |
| Negation of non-verbal predicates | Negative AUX + connegative verb |
| Negation in dependent clauses | Negative AUX + connegative verb |

=== Inari Sami ===
The negative verb is conjugated in moods and personal forms in Inari Sami.

Indicative, conditional, and potential mood

| Person | Singular | Dual | Plural |
|---|---|---|---|
| 1. | jie´m | eän | ep |
| 2. | jie´h | eppee | eppeđ |
| 3. | ij | eä´vá | eä |

Imperative

| Person | Singular | Dual | Plural |
|---|---|---|---|
| 1. | eällum | eäl´loon | eällup |
| 2. | ele | ellee | elleđ |
| 3. | eä´lus | eällus | eällus |

=== Northern Sami ===
The negative verb is conjugated in moods and personal forms in Northern Sami.

Indicative, conditional, and potential mood

| Person | Singular | Dual | Plural |
|---|---|---|---|
| 1. | in | ean | eat |
| 2. | it | eahppi | ehpet |
| 3. | ii | eaba | eai |

Imperative

| Person | Singular | Dual | Plural |
|---|---|---|---|
| 1. | allon | allu | allot |
| 2. | ale | alli | allet |
| 3. | allos | alloska | alloset |

=== Lule Sami ===
The negative verb is conjugated in moods and personal forms in Lule Sami.

Indicative, conditional, and potential mood

| Person | Singular | Dual | Plural |
|---|---|---|---|
| 1. | iv | en | ep |
| 2. | i | ähppe | ehpit |
| 3. | ij | äbá | e |

=== Hungarian ===
Hungarian has lost most evidence of a negative verb, but the negation particle 'nem' becomes 'ne' before verbs in the jussive/imperative (also sometimes called the conditional mood or J-mood). Furthermore, the 3rd person present indicative of the copular verb ('lenni') has unique negative forms 'nincs(en)' and 'nincsenek' as opposed to 'nem van' and 'nem vannak', but only when the particle and verb would occur adjacently. In all other instances, the copular verb acts regularly. These forms are also unique in that they have an existential role "there is (not)" and "there are (not)". In the present indicative 3rd person, copular verbs are not used; rather the absence of a verb (with or without a negation particle) implies the copula.

=== Komi ===
In the Komi language, the negative marker and the form of the negative construction are dependent on the clausal tense. If the corresponding affirmative predicate is based on a verbal form, a negative auxiliary is used. This is not convertible for affirmative verbs with nominal forms. The negative auxiliary is used in present tense, future tense, 1st past tense of indicative, and in the imperative and optative mood.

==== Negative Verb - Strategies in clausal negations ====
| SN | present & future tense; 1st past tense; 2nd past tense; 3rd past tense; 4th past tense; 5th past tense; 6th past tense | 'o-' + V - Connegative (CNG) 'e-' + V - Connegative 'abu' + V 'veli' + 'o-' + V - Connegative a) 'abu' + 'veli' + V b) 'e-' + 'be' - CNG + V 'velem' + 'o-' + V - CNG 'velem' + 'ab' + V |
| Negation of imperatives | Imperative (2nd person only) Optative (3rd person only) Conditional (all tenses) | 'e-' + V - CNG 'med' + 'o-' + V - CNG '(v)éske(u)' + SN |
| Negation in dependent/subordinate clauses | finite subordinate clauses; non-finite subordinate verb forms: i. Infinitives ii. participles iii. converbs | SN 'ńe' + V-infinitive V + 'tem' V + 'teg' |

== Korean ==
Korean verbs can be negated by the negative verbs 않다 anta and 못하다 mothada or by the negative adverbs 안 an and 못 mot. The copula 이다 ida has a corresponding negative copula 아니다 anida. (anida is an independent word like anta and mothada, unlike ida which cannot stand on its own and must be attached to a noun.)

| Verb | Tense | Affirmative | With a negative verb | | With a negative adverb | |
| Verb | Tense | Affirmative | 않다 anta | 못하다 mothada | 안 an | 못 mot |
|---|---|---|---|---|---|---|
| 가다 gada to go | Nonpast | 간다 ganda | 가지 않는다 gaji anneunda | 가지 못한다 gaji mothanda | 안 간다 an ganda | 못 간다 mot ganda |
| 가다 gada to go | Past | 갔다 gatda | 가지 않았다 gaji anatda | 가지 못했다 gaji mothaetda | 안 갔다 an gatda | 못 갔다 mot gatda |
| 먹다 meokda to eat | Nonpast | 먹는다 meongneunda | 먹지 않는다 meokji anneunda | 먹지 못한다 meokji mothanda | 안 먹는다 an meongneunda | 못 먹는다 mot meongneunda |
| 먹다 meokda to eat | Past | 먹었다 meogeotda | 먹지 않았다 meokji anatda | 먹지 못했다 meokji mothaetda | 안 먹었다 an meogeotda | 못 먹었다 mot meogeotda |

== Japanese ==
nai (ない) can be a verb for negation or a suffix to indicate the negative form of i-adjectives in Japanese.
