= Helsinki slang =

Local dialect and a sociolect of the Finnish language

- stadin slangi
- Region: Helsinki
- Language family: Uralic: Finnic; Finnish; Helsinki slang
- Writing system: Finnish alphabet

Language codes
- ISO 639-3: –
- IETF: fi-stadi

Helsinki slang or stadin slangi ('Helsinki's slang', from Swedish stad, 'city'; see etymology) is a local dialect and a sociolect of the Finnish language mainly used in the capital city of Helsinki. It is characterized by its abundance of foreign loan words not found in the other Finnish dialects.

Helsinki slang first evolved in the late 19th century as a sociolect of the multilingual Helsinki working-class communities, where Swedish- and Finnish-speaking youth lived together with Russian, German and various other language minorities. Helsinki slang is not a typical dialect of Finnish, because unlike many other parts of Finland, the Helsinki area was predominantly Swedish-speaking during the time when the city of Helsinki originally evolved, and thus Helsinki slang is characterised by an unusual, strikingly large number of obvious foreign loanwords. Nevertheless, Helsinki slang is counted as a dialect on its own right, among the purer dialects of other parts of Finland.

Grammatically Helsinki slang is based on colloquial Finnish. It is characterized by a large number of words originally borrowed from Swedish, German and Russian, but nowadays chiefly English. The loanwords replace some of even the most mundane Finnish-language words (closest kin words, food, die, etc.) with foreign alternatives. However, when spoken by a native Finnish speaker, all words are inflected by the rules of spoken Finnish, and the language sounds distinctively Finnish.

The language's history can generally be divided into the old slang (vanha slangi) and the new or modern slang (uusi slangi). Old slang was common in Helsinki up to the mid-20th century, and is thicker and harder to understand for an outsider of the group, even to one who would be capable in modern slang, because it incorporates a far greater number of Swedish, German and Russian loan-words than the modern variation. Old slang is mostly spoken by older Helsinkians, many of whom consider it the only true slang.

The modern variety has evolved side-by-side with the growing influence of English-language youth subcultures starting from the 1950s. It is thus characterized by a greater influence of the English language and proper Finnish language while the influence of Swedish, German and Russian has declined. The modern slang is healthy and continues to evolve. It is spoken to varying degrees by almost all native Helsinkians.

== Etymology ==
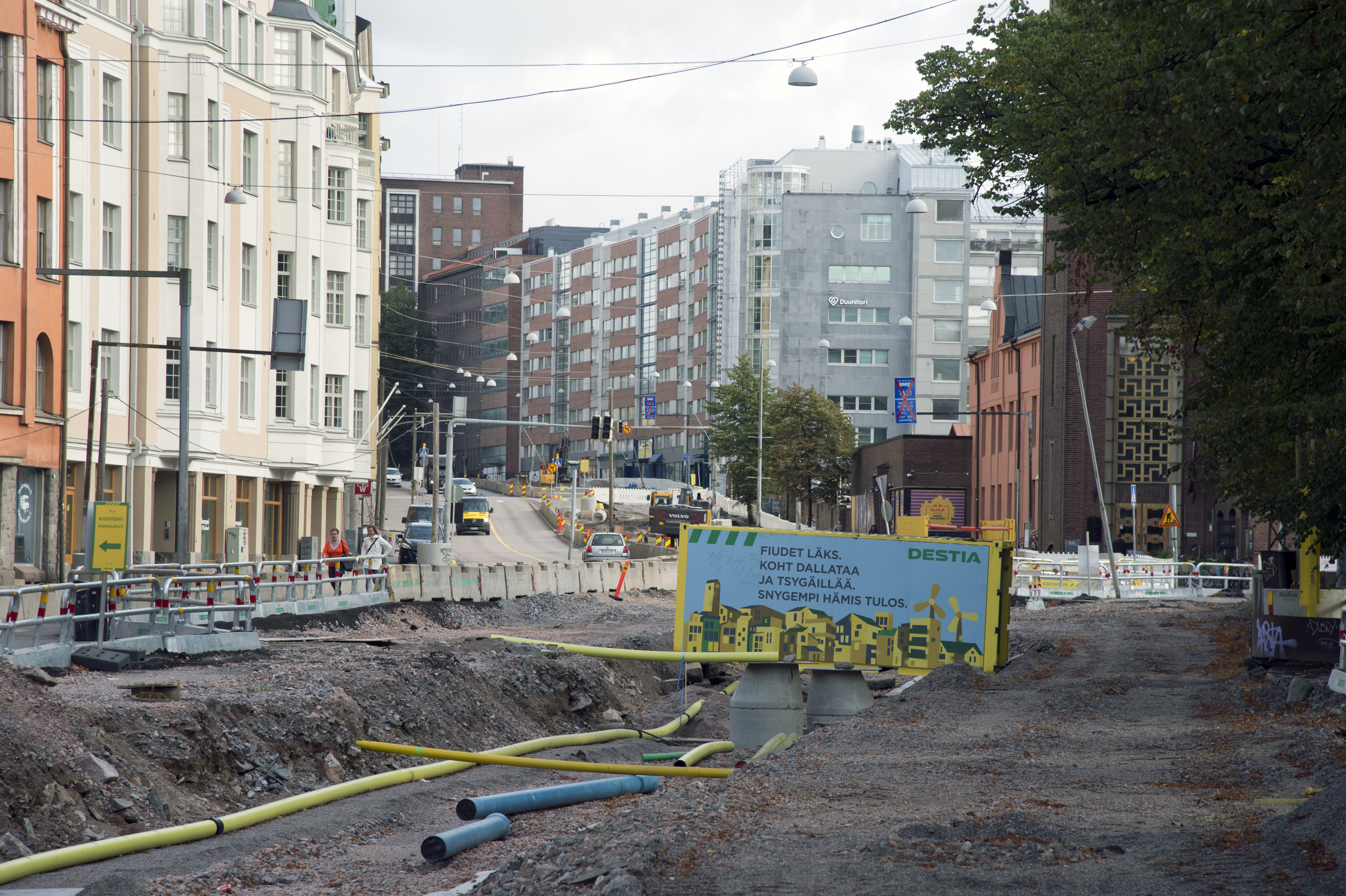
Hämeentie, the second longest street in Helsinki, was under construction in 2019–2020. The yellow-blue sign, humorously written in Helsinki slang, says: "Cars are gone, soon we walk and cycle. A better Hämeentie is on the way."

Helsinkians themselves never refer to their slang as Helsinki slang(i) but instead as stadin slangi or simply slangi. Stadi is a slang word itself, borrowed from the Swedish stad, 'city'. Literally, the name would mean 'slang of the city', but stadi always means just the city of Helsinki in the slang – all other cities are unconditionally referred to by the common Finnish word for 'city' (kaupunki).

More importantly, Helsinki slang is not strictly speaking a slang in the word's modern definition, but rather a dialect and a sociolect. However, the term slang has stuck since long, especially as the language refers to itself as slangi.

== History ==
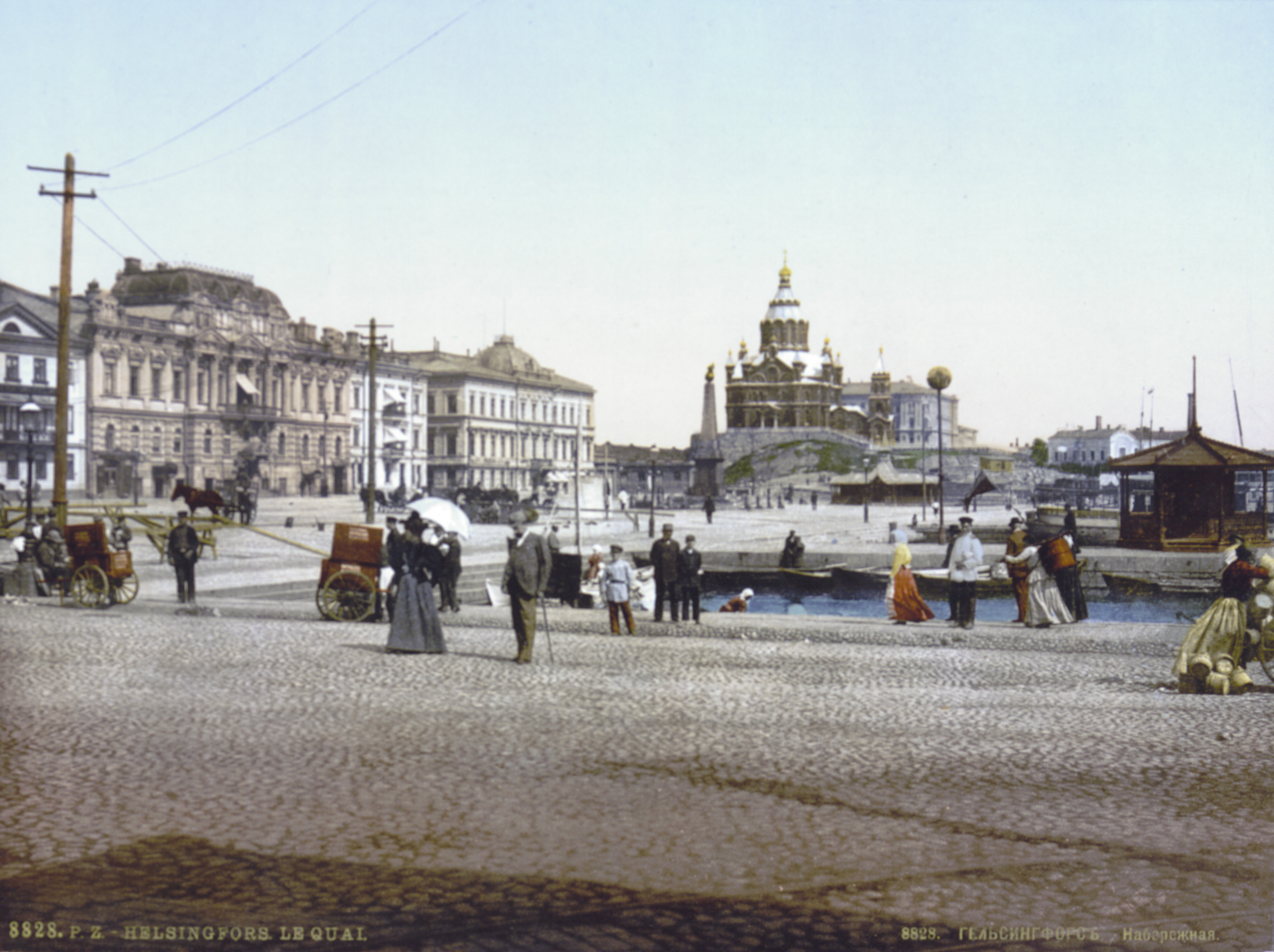
Helsinki in the 1890s

=== Roots in the 1880s ===
Helsinki was founded in 1550 by Gustav I of Sweden in the coastal Swedish-speaking region of Finland. When in 1809 Sweden lost Finland to Imperial Russia, Helsinki became the capital of Finland by the decision of Alexander I of Russia. At this time, Helsinki was almost unilingually Swedish. In 1820, for example, the city was home to about 4,500 people, only 5% of whom were Finnish-speaking.

With the new capital status, the city's centre was rebuilt and a continuous growth was sustained. By 1880 the population had grown almost ten-fold to 43,000, mostly due to industrialization. This brought ever-increasing numbers of new Finnish-speaking working class from around the country to the largely Swedish-speaking city. In the 1870 census 57% of Helsinkians spoke Swedish as their home language, 26% Finnish, 12% Russian and 2% German, while also increasing numbers of residents were capable in both Swedish and Finnish. Helsinki slang is believed to have first begun to evolve among the mixed-language working-class people of the 1880s. In addition to Swedish and Finnish, influence came from Russian and German.

Helsinki slang is thought to have formed naturally as a sort of a common language for the mixed-language population who due to industrialization moved into the same neighbourhoods for employment, and had no single common language initially. The slang came to be for practical purposes of everyday communication and mutual understanding as a common language of the various language groups. For example, at this time about one fifth of newly-wed couples had different native languages.

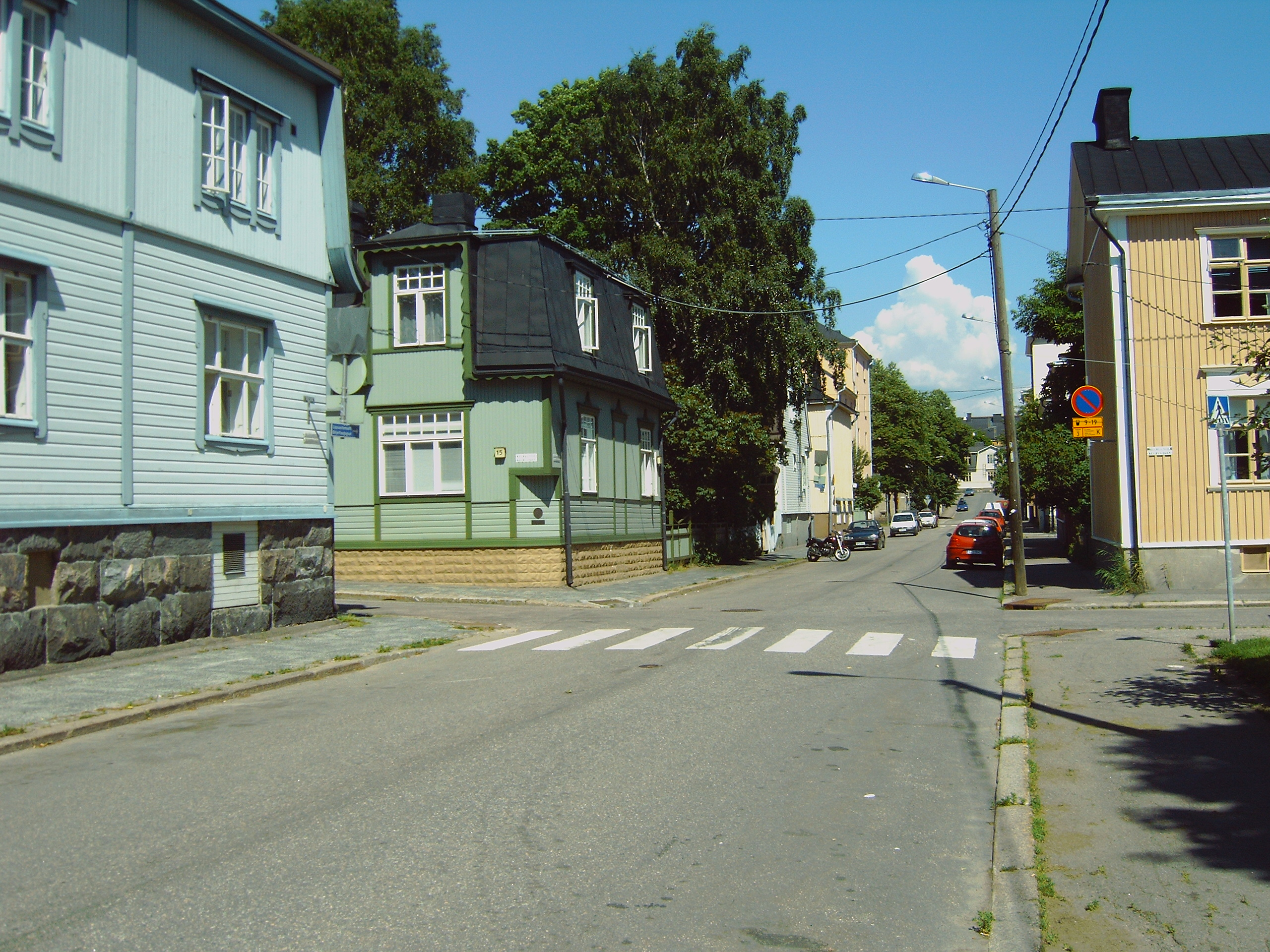
Vallila district still boasts wooden houses from the 1910s

The working class population was at this time concentrated in Kallio, Vallila, Sörnäinen and Arabia. Helsinki slang was probably first born in these tightly populated neighbourhoods in their factories, multilingual homes, markets and on their streets. Some have referred to slangi's roots as a pidgin language or the lingua franca of this multilingual population.

=== Youth's language ===
From early on Helsinki slang was especially the language of the youth. It could be thought as a social language code, by which the multicultural and multilingual working class youth, a speech community, formed their own sociolect. The initiative for this grew at first from their needs of basic everyday communication, but soon slangi probably came to signify a certain social status as well. Johannes Kauhanen notes on his slang history page that the first speakers of Helsinki slang were probably not the countryside-born agriculturists who moved to work in Helsinki, but their children.

The first known written account in Helsinki slang is from the 1890 short story Hellaassa by young Santeri Ivalo (words that do not exist in, or deviate from, the standard spoken Finnish of its time are in italics):

Kun minä eilen illalla palasin labbiksesta, tapasin Aasiksen kohdalla Supiksen, ja niin me laskeusimme tänne Espikselle, jossa oli mahoton hyvä piikis. Mutta me mentiin Studikselle suoraan Hudista tapaamaan, ja jäimme sinne pariksi tunniksi, kunnes ajoimme Kaisikseen.

=== Modernization ===
Helsinki slang vocabulary development
Years	Finnish	Swedish	Russian	English	German
1890–1920	>20	75	<5	<1	<1
1900–1920	30	60	2	—N/a	—N/a
1910–1940	39	50	2	2	1
1979	60	20	—N/a	10	—N/a
1985–1989	78	11	—N/a	9	—N/a
Approximate proportions (%) of word origins by year. Source

The old slang continued to develop up until the 1940s. In 1944 the Continuation War between the Soviet Union and Finland ended in the Moscow Armistice, and Finland had to cede large parts of Karelia to the Soviet Union. About 430,000 people became refugees within their own country. Many of them settled in Helsinki while, in the society at large, the transition from the agricultural society continued ever stronger.

In practice the following years, especially the 1960s, meant the second major wave of immigration to Helsinki. This had an effect on the slang as well. 1940s mark the beginning of the gradual transition between the old slang (vanha slangi) and modern speech (uusi slangi).

The new population was, and continues to be, in greater numbers Finnish-speaking, and the Swedish and Russian influences on the language have declined ever since. The language started to move more towards common colloquial Finnish while still strongly borrowing from the old slang.

The following generations also grew up in a different kind of cultural environment, where more abundant amounts of foreign culture, especially entertainment such as films and music, was, and continues to be, available. The cultural influence of the English-speaking world, especially the North American youth subcultures, grew, and increasing numbers of English-language words started to find their way to the language of the urban Helsinki youth. With the popularity of television and the advent of the Internet, this trend continues ever stronger in the present day.

==== Evolution ====
Although like any local dialect, Helsinki slang constantly evolves, most adult speakers of Helsinki slang still consider the pre-1960s version the real slang. Many of the now-adult speakers who grew up with the 1950s-style slang consider the modern chiefly English-derived slang terms neologisms. Nevertheless, even if words are borrowed to the slang, they are still in the present day modified to conform to the phonotactics of the slang. As noted below, the phonotactics are slightly different from typical colloquial Finnish.

== Language characteristics ==
The borrowed words may violate phonological rules of the Finnish language, such as vowel harmony. They also include phonemes /b/, /d/ and /g/ and consonant clusters such as /sn/ rarely found in other Finnish dialects. Yet the words remain indisputably Finnish, incorporating Finnish grammar and mostly obeying Finnish phonotactics. Some rather arbitrary, but creative and distinctly Finnish expressive constructions are often used especially in the modern slang, e.g. päräyttää.

Furthermore, arbitrary modifications are found — these make the resulting slang words alien both to the speakers of regular Finnish and the borrowing language. For example, Finland Swedish (Sipoo dialect) burk 'cranky' is modified into spurgu 'drunkard', where the added 's' is arbitrary, as is the voicing change of 'k' to 'g'. Derivation of fillari, 'a bicycle' from velociped is even more convoluted: velociped in the Swedish language game fikonspråk is filociped-vekon, which became filusari and further fillari – only the 'l' is etymologically original. A similar process happened with the slang word fiude, car, which retains no letters in common with the original word "auto."

Some distinctive aspects in Helsinki slang are:

- Very swift pace of pronunciation and speech
- The voiced consonants /b d ɡ/, which are rare in standard Finnish, are abundant: budjaa ('to dwell'), brakaa ('to break, to malfunction'), dorka ('dork'), duuni ('work'), gimma ('girl'), goisaa ('to sleep'). Many speakers, though, especially in the modern variety, use several of these words with voiceless /p t k/: prakaa, kimma, koisaa.
- Consonant clusters in the beginning of words, which appear natively only in south-western Finnish dialects, are commonplace, like Stadi ('Helsinki'), glesa ('sick'), skeglu ('knife'), flinda ('bottle')
- Shortened or diminutive forms of words. Common noun endings used include -is (fleggis 'open fire', kondis "condition"), -ari (Flemari 'the street Fleminginkatu', snagari 'a grill stand') and -de (krunde and klande 'heads and tails' (< Standard Finnish kruuna and klaava 'ibid.'))
- Slang and foreign word roots do not conform to vowel harmony, although their suffixes do (Sörkka, Sörkasta pro Sörkkä, Sörkästä < Sörnäinen), Tölika pro Tölikä < Töölö, byysat pro byysät, 'trousers'). This does not affect native Finnish words.
  - With some speakers this goes even further; Standard Finnish /æ/ and /ɑ/ appear to be merging as /a/, a new neutral vowel. Before the modern period, this change has happened in Estonian and other southern Finnic languages.
- Surplus S appearing in beginning of words, forming consonant clusters: stoge 'train' (cf. Swedish tåg), skitta 'guitar' (cf. Swedish gitarr), skoude 'policeman'
- Ceceo or lisp on /s/, pronouncing it as a sharp, dental /s̪/, or even /θ/ as in English "thing". This is considered an effeminate feature, but appears sometimes also in males' speech.

=== Variation ===
The old slang's vocabulary and form of speech had some variation in between different parts of the town. As noted above, the language was born north of the Pitkäsilta bridge, but it later spread to the southern neighborhoods as well, including Punavuori (Rööperi in slang). The variation was most prominent in between the slang spoken on the two sides of the bridge.

== Usage and examples ==
Many literary works in Helsinki slang contain long sentences with a large density of slang words, making them especially hard to decipher for the general Finnish-speaking population. Examples where the slang words are in italics and in the same order in both the original and translation follow:

Quote source	Slang version	Written Finnish equivalent	English translation
Viivi & Wagner comics	Hei sporakuski, stikkaa dörtsi posee, tääl on galsa blosis, bonjaatsä?	Hei raitiovaunun kuljettaja, laita ovi kiinni, täällä on kylmä viima, ymmärrätkö?	Hey, tramdriver, push the door shut, there's a cold wind in here, do you understand?
Sami Garam's slang version of Donald Duck	Kelaa, Snadi Jeesaaja, kui iisii täl ois stedaa!	Ajattele, Pikku Apulainen, kuinka helppoa tällä olisi siivota!	Think, Little Helper, how easy it would be to clean with this!
Tuomari Nurmio's song "Tonnin stiflat" (Note: Pun based on the word tonni, meaning both a ton (measure of weight) and, in colloquial Finnish, thousand units of money.)	Klabbeissa on mulla tonnin stiflat. Ei ne tonnii paina, ne bungaa sen. Joskus mä stygen niille tsungaan, sillon kun mä muille tsungaa en.	Jaloissani minulla on tonnin kengät. Eivät ne tonnia paina, vaan maksavat sen. Joskus minä laulun niille laulan, silloin kun minä muille laula en.	On my feet I have ton shoes. They don't weigh a ton, they cost that. Sometimes a song I sing to them, when I don't sing to others.
Helsinki ice-hockey club HIFK's season ticket advertisement	Kandee hiffaa skaffaa, et ei tartte bluffaa et ois kliffaa.	Kannattaa tajuta hankkia, jotta ei tarvitse teeskennellä että on kivaa.	You should grasp the need to acquire [one of these], so you don't need to pretend to be having fun.

Slang words obey normal Finnish grammar, regardless of their etymology. However, Helsinki slang is always both spoken and written as colloquial Finnish, never as properly grammatical kirjakieli (lit. 'book language', see spoken Finnish). For example, "can you fix that in a working condition?" is "voitsä duunaa ton kondiksee?" in slang, where duunaa, 'to do, to work' and kondis, 'condition, working order' are slang words. Trying to write the above sentence in properly grammatical form like in kirjakieli, to "voitko (sinä) duunata tuon kondikseen?" would be erroneous both in kirjakieli and slang.

Helsinki slang is also used by the Swedish-speaking Finnish minority in Helsinki. Modern Helsinkian Swedish-based slangi is still spoken in the same manner as in Finnish, mixing it into the Swedish language. The earlier example "can you put that in order?" would be "kan du duuna dendä' kondiksee?" when spoken by a Swedish-speaking Finn in Helsinki slang. The same sentence would be similarly erroneous in proper Finland Swedish language as well.

== Famous speakers ==
Several famous Helsinkians, especially musicians, are known for their skill in the slang, and have partially or entirely performed in it in public.

=== Musicians ===
- Georg Malmstén – musician (1930s–1980)
- Tuomari Nurmio – rock musician (1979–)
- Remu Aaltonen – rock musician (1960s–)
- Asa (Avain), Finnish rap artist (1990s–)
- Steen1, rap artist (1990s–)
- Thono Slowknow, rap artist (1996–)

=== Writers ===
- See #Literature

== Literature ==
Several books and comics have been published written entirely in Helsinki slang, both as translations and as newly authored texts, or something in between. This is only a partial list, slanted towards the modern times.

=== Novels and short stories ===
- Eero Salola: Ilman fritsaria (1920s)
- Pentti Saarikoski: Sieppari ruispellossa (Tammi, 1961) — Saarikoski's first Finnish-language translation of The Catcher in the Rye was controversially written in the Helsinki slang.
- Arvo Turtiainen: Minä paljasjalkainen (Tammi, 1962)
- Tauno Rautapalo: Pena kertoo stoorin (Otava, 1963)
- Edvard Janzon: Rundi stadis välil snadis (Gummerus, 1997) ISBN 951-20-5231-8
- Edvard Janzon: Palsa kanis, litski kalis (Gummerus, 2002) ISBN 951-20-6092-2
- Tuomas Vimma: Helsinki 12 (Otava, 2004) ISBN 951-1-19642-1
- Arvo Pohjola: Himaföneri (Minimo.fi, 2005)
- Edvard Janzon: Villi Vallila (Kesuura, 2006) ISBN 951-812-112-5
- Sami Garam: Seitsemän broidii (Johnny Kniga, 2003) — Seven Brothers

=== Comics ===
- Sami Garam: Aku Ankka – Rotsi on mut byysat puuttuu (2001) — Carl Barks' Donald Duck (name translates to "Has a jacket but is missing pants")
- Sami Garam: Snögeli ja seittemän snadii starbuu (WSOY, 2001) ISBN 951-0-25703-6 — Snow White and the Seven Dwarfs
- Sami Garam: Jörde-Juge
- Sami Garam: Kessen rehukotsa (Egmont Kustannus, 2005) ISBN 952-469-399-2 — Asterix and the Laurel Wreath

=== Dictionaries ===
- Heikki and Marjatta Paunonen: Tsennaaks Stadii, bonjaaks slangii: Stadin slangin suursanakirja (WSOY, 2000) ISBN 951-0-23239-4 — won Tieto-Finlandia 2001
- Kaarina Karttunen: Nykyslangin sanakirja (WSOY, 1979) ISBN 951-0-09050-6
- Juhani Mäkelä: Stadin snadi slangisanakirja (WSOY, 1997) ISBN 951-0-22477-4
- Jukka Annala: Remusanakirja (Teos, 2008)

=== Biblical ===
- Olli Seppälä: Luukkaan evankeliumi slangiks skrivattuna (Kirjapaja, 2001) ISBN 951-625-740-2 — The Gospel of Luke
- Olli Seppälä: Stadilaisten katkismus (Kirjapaja, 2000) ISBN 951-625-676-7
- Pentti Malaste: Uusi testamentti stadin slangilla (Gummerus, 2001) ISBN 951-20-5828-6 — The New Testament

=== Other ===
- Erkki Johannes Kauhanen: Slangivisa (Tammi, 2002) ISBN 951-31-2533-5
- Erkki Mattsson: Ei se skulaa joka skagaa (Edico Oy, 1999) ISBN 951-97542-1-0 – One who is afraid does not play
- Erkki Mattsson: Griinataa kimpassa (Edico Oy, 2001) ISBN 951-97542-2-9 – Let's laugh together

== Notes ==
- Translations (): 'mother' mutsi, mude (old/new), mursa (old); 'father' faija, fatsi, fade (old/new); 'food' safka, sapuska (< Rus. закуска) (old/new), fuudi (< Engl. 'food') (new), sporga, sagga (old); 'die' delata, kolata (old/new), debata (new)
- Whether Sörkka or Sörkkä is the correct slang form of Sörnäinen has been the subject of a heated debate for a long time. Sörkka, violating vowel harmony, has a more nonstandard appearance that suggests slang authenticity, but equally well it may be the result of hypercorrection. On the other hand, Sörkkä sounds like Sörkka in the way a naive, non-native speaker would say it. Some suggest a compromise, saying that the former should be used of the place and the latter of the Sörnäinen prison, while some say one is merely more recent than the other. Still, authoritative institutions such as the slang dictionary and the Helsinki City Museum take a neutral stance in the debate.
