= Károly Garam =

Finnish-Hungarian cellist (born 1941)

- Born: 10 May 1941 (age 85); Eger, Heves, Kingdom of Hungary
- Education: Sibelius Academy
- Occupation: Cellist
- Years active: 1966–1990s
- Style: Classical
- Relatives: Lajos Garam (brother)

Károly Garam (born 10 May 1941, Eger) is a Hungarian-Finnish cellist and the brother of violinist Lajos Garam.

Garam studied cello at the Sibelius Academy in Finland under Vili Pullinen and Yrjö Selin. He held his first concert in 1966.

== Recordings ==
Sources:

- Minä rakastan sinua (1979)
- Aattoiltana (1988)
- Lauluja sinulle (1990)
