= Finnish noun cases =

Declination patterns for nouns in the Finnish language

Finnish nominals, which include pronouns, adjectives, and numerals, are declined in a large number of grammatical cases, whose uses and meanings are detailed here. See also Finnish grammar.

Many meanings expressed by case markings in Finnish correspond to phrases or expressions containing prepositions in most Indo-European languages. Because so much information is coded in Finnish through its cases, the use of adpositions (postpositions in this case) is more limited than in English, for instance.

== List of Finnish cases ==
Note regarding the examples: Finnish has no grammatical gender nor definite and indefinite articles. Thus, context may be required to get an accurate translation.

Finnish cases
Case	Suffix	English prep.	Example	Translation
Grammatical
Nominative		-	Talo on helppo sana.	House is an easy word.
Genitive	-n	(-'s)	En pidä tämän talon väristä.	I don't like this house's colour / the colour of this house.
Accusative	or -n	(object, whole)	Maalaan talon. Auta maalaamaan talo!	I'll paint the house. Help me paint the house!
Partitive	-(t)a -(t)ä	(object, part/incomplete)	Maalaan taloa.	I'm painting a house.
Locative (internal)
Inessive	-ssa -ssä	in	Asun talossa.	I live in the house.
Elative	-sta -stä	from (inside)	Poistu talostani!	Get out of my house!
Illative	-hVn, -Vn, -seen	into	Menen hänen taloonsa.	I'm going (in)to his/her house.
Locative (external)
Adessive	-lla -llä	at, on	Nähdään talolla!	See you at the house!
Ablative	-lta -ltä	from	Kävelin talolta toiselle.	I walked from [one] house to another.
Allative	-lle	to (outside), onto	Koska saavut talolle?	When will you be arriving to the house?
Essive
Essive	-na -nä	as	Käytätkö tätä hökkeliä talona?	Are you using this shack as a house?
Translative	-ksi	into (transformation)	Muutan sen taloksi.	I'll turn it into a house.
Marginal
Instructive	-n, -in	with, using	He levittivät sanomaansa rakentaminsa taloin.	They passed on their message with (using) the houses they built.
Abessive	-tta -ttä	without	On vaikeaa elää talotta.	It's difficult to live without a house.
Comitative	-ne-	together (with)	Hän vaikuttaa varakkaalta monine taloineen.	He appears to be wealthy, with the numerous houses he has.

=== Grammatical cases ===
The grammatical cases perform core linguistic functions such as signaling who initiates an action or the object of an action.

==== Nominative ====
The basic form of the noun.

Characteristic ending: none in the singular
talo = 'a/the house'
kirja = 'a/the book'
mäki = 'a/the hill'
vesi = '(the) water'

==== Genitive ====
Characteristic ending: -n possibly modified by consonant gradation: mäki → mäen, talo → talon. For the nouns and adjectives that have two vowel stems, the weak vowel stem comes from the genitive singular.

The genitive indicates possession. It is also used preceding postpositions. However, it is homophonous (but not cognate) to the accusative, which may cause some confusion.
kirja/n kuvat = 'the pictures in the book'
talo/n seinät = 'the walls of the house'
mäe/n päällä = 'on top of the hill'
vede/n alla = 'under water'

Finnish also uses possessive affixes together with the genitive case
häne/n talo/nsa = 'her/his house(s)'

==== Accusative ====
This case marks direct objects. The accusative indicates telicity; that is, the object has been finalized or the intended action is done. Note that a morphologically distinct accusative case exists in Finnish only for the personal pronouns and the personal interrogative pronoun:

Singular
- minut = me
- sinut = you
- Teidät = you (polite)
- hänet = him/her/it/them
Plural
- meidät = us
- teidät = you
- heidät = them
Question
- kenet = whom

In contrast, nouns, adjectives, numerals, and other pronouns, do not have a distinct accusative case. Instead, singular direct objects look like the genitive in direct address (Tuon maton "I'll bring the carpet") and in the nominative with both imperatives (Tuo matto! "Bring the carpet!") and passives (Matto on tuotu "The carpet has been brought"). Plural direct objects always appear in the nominative plural.

Traditionally, Finnish grammars have considered, on syntactic grounds, the accusative to be a case unto itself, despite its appearing identical to the nominative or genitive case. The major Finnish grammar Iso suomen kielioppi, published in 2004, takes a morphological point of view and does not list the accusative except for the personal pronouns and kuka, while at the same time acknowledging the argument for the traditional view. The existence or nonexistence of an accusative case in Finnish thus depends on one's point of view. Historically, the similarity of the accusative and genitive endings is coincidental. The older accusative ending was -m, but in modern Finnish an m has become an n when it is the last sound of a word.

==== Partitive ====
Characteristic ending: -ta/-tä, where the 't' elides if intervocalic. The consonant stem of a noun (if any) comes from the partitive singular. Otherwise the ending is added to the strong vowel stem.

The basic meaning of this case is a lack of telicity, that is, it is not indicated whether the intended result has been achieved. For example, Join vettä "I drank water-part." indicates that there is possibly some water left, while the accusative Join veden indicates all water has been consumed. It is not perfectivity. The partitive is the second most common case in Finnish. It has also other uses:
After numerals, except number 1:
- kolme taloa = 'three houses'
- kaksi lasta = 'two children'
For incomplete actions and ongoing processes whose ending or end result is unknown (the partitive object):
- luen kirjaa = "I'm reading a book"
- hän opetti minua lukemaan = "s/he was teaching me to read"
- rakastan sinua = "I love you"
- ajattelin huomista = "I thought about tomorrow"
With nouns of indefinite number or substance nouns (the partitive object):
- onko teillä kirjoja? = "do you have any books?"
- haluan vettä = "I want some water"
For negative statements and for tentative inquiries (the partitive object):
- talossa ei ole yhtään kirjaa = "there is not a book in the house"
- en nähnyt häntä = "I didn't see him/her"
- saanko lainata kirjaa? = "can I borrow the book?"
With prepositions
- ennen mäkeä = "before the hill"
- ilman takkia = "without a coat"
Very rarely indicates location (coming from/ being found somewhere):
- rannempaa = "closer to the shore"
- lännempää = "further west"

The formation of the partitive plural is rather variable, but the basic principle is to add '-i-' to the inflecting stem, followed by the '-(t)a' partitive ending. However, in a similar way to verb imperfects, the '-i-' can cause changes to the final vowel of the stem, leading to an apparent diversity of forms.

=== Locative cases ===
The most prototypical function of locative cases is to indicate location, as the name suggests. However, they are also used in a range of syntactic constructions, much like prepositions in Indo-European languages (e.g. We're *at* school vs. We're good *at* math, in which only the first at has a locative meaning). In Finnish, the suffix -lla as a locative means "on (top)", but may function to code the idea of "being used as an instrument", e.g. kirjoitan kynällä "I write with a pen" (lit. 'I write pen-on').

Two different kinds of suffixes are used, the internal locatives (-s-) and the external locatives (-l-).

The word in a locative case refers to the verb, for example, in Sovitan housuja ikkunassa the word ikkunassa "in the window" refers to the verb sovitan "I try on", not to the adjacent noun housuja "pants". The sentence reads out as "I'm in the window, trying on pants". However, in context due to the instrumental nature of the window and the word order, the sentence stands for "I'm trying on pants (on display) in the window".

=== Internal locatives ===
==== Inessive ====
Characteristic ending -ssa/-ssä added to the weak vowel stem.

The first of the six so-called "local" cases, which as their basic meaning correspond to locational prepositions in English. The inessive carries the basic meaning "inside" or "in"
- talossa = "in the house"
It is also commonplace to indicate time or immediate contact with the inessive
- joulukuussa = "in December"
- joulukuusessa = "on the Christmas tree"

==== Elative ====
Characteristic ending -sta/-stä added to the weak vowel stem.

The second of the local cases, with the basic meaning of "coming out from inside" or "out of"
- tuli kaapista = "(they(sg.)) came out of the closet"
Like the inessive, the elative can also be used to indicate time or immediate contact. Can also indicate origin or cause.
- viime joulusta lähtien = "since last Christmas"
- nouse sängystä = "get out of the bed"
- tehty villasta = "made of wool"
- vihreänä kateudesta = "green with envy"
The elative is also used to express a liking.
- minä pidän kahvista = "I like coffee"

==== Illative ====
The ending is usually -Vn, where V indicates the preceding vowel of the stem. Singular forms use the strong stem form. In cases where the genitive stem already ends in a long vowel the ending is -seen (singular) and -siin (plural). However, for words of one syllable the ending is always -hVn and this form is also used in plural forms where the plural stem already contains a vowel (other than i ) immediately before the plural i.

Some dialects, such as Pohjanmaa, use the -hVn more generally.

This is the third of the local cases, with the basic meaning "into"
- meni taloon = "(he) went into the house" - regular formation from talo -Vn
- veteen = "into the water" - regular formation from vesi, strong singular stem vete- -Vn
- vesiin = "into the waters" - regular formation from vesi, plural stem vesi- -Vn
- kuuhun = "to the moon" - single syllable variation -hVn
- Lontooseen = "to London" - long vowel stem variation from Lontoo (London) -seen
- kauniiseen taloon = "into the beautiful house" -kaunis has singular stem -kaunii- therefore -seen variation
- kauniisiin taloihin = "into the beautiful houses" - plural -siin because of singular -seen and plural -hVn due to the additional vowel i in the plural stem "taloi"

The illative can also indicate close contact, time or cause
- huomiseen = "until tomorrow" (from huominen)
- kevääseen = "until spring" (from kevät)
- kylmään voi kuolla = "one can die of cold"
- syy johonkin = "the reason for, the cause of something"

=== External locatives ===
==== Adessive ====
Characteristic ending -lla/-llä added to the weak vowel stem.

The fourth of the local cases, with the basic meaning 'on top of' or 'in close proximity of'
- mäellä = "on the hill"
- ovella = "at the door"
Adessive is also used with the verb 'olla' to indicate possession
- minulla on kirja = "I have a book"
It can also indicate time, instrument, means or way
- aamulla = "in the morning"
- talvella = "in the winter" (but note viime talve|na = "last winter")
- bussilla = "by bus"
- vasaralla = "with a hammer"
- kävellä varpaillaan = "to walk on tiptoe/ on one's toes"
The adessive is very commonly used in a way that is equivalent to the Swedish preposition "med" (or English "with"), but this is traditionally deprecated as ungrammatical.
- emme tiedä varmuudella = "we do not know with certainty" (cf. Swedish "med säkerhet")
- rakkaudella = "with love" (as a letter closing or greeting)
- lettuja hillolla = "pancakes with jam"

==== Ablative ====
Characteristic ending -lta/-ltä added to the weak vowel stem.

The fifth of the local cases, with the basic meaning "from off of" - a poor English equivalent, but necessary to distinguish it from "from out of", which would be elative.
- mäeltä = "from (off) the hill"
- nousin sohvalta = "(I) got up from the sofa"
- Liisa sai kirjan minulta = "Liisa got the book from me"
The ablative can also indicate time and it can be used to convey information about qualities
- kahdeksalta = "at eight (o'clock)"
- hän on ulkonäöltään miellyttävä = (freely:) "they(sg.) have a pleasant appearance"

==== Allative ====
Characteristic ending -lle added to the weak vowel stem.

The sixth of the local cases, with the basic meaning "onto".
- mäelle = "onto the hill"
Another meaning is "to someone" or "for someone" (the grammatical role served by the dative case in many other languages)
- minä annan kirjan Liisalle = "I give the book to Liisa"
- pöytä kahdelle = "a table for two"
- se on tärkeä minulle = "it is important to me"
With verbs of sensation, it is possible to use either the ablative or allative case
- tuoksuu hyvältä / hyvälle = "(it) smells good"

== "General locatives" and other cases ==
The name "general locatives" is sometimes used of the essive and translative cases (as well as partitive above) because their oldest meanings imply that they have been used to indicate location.

=== Essive ===
Characteristic ending -na. If the noun or adjective has two vowel stems, the strong vowel stem comes from the essive singular. NB the consonant stem used to be quite common in the essive, and some nouns and adjectives still have this feature.

This case sometimes carries the meaning of a temporary state of being, often equivalent to the English "as a ...", or of something being expressed in terms of another thing
- lapsena = "as a child", "when (I) was a child"
- vetenä = "as water"
- pieninä palasina = "in small pieces"
- Paljonko on viisi euroa dollareina? = "How much is five Euros in Dollars?"
- se on täynnä = "it is full"
The essive is also used for the time when something takes place, but not for clock time:
- huomenna = "tomorrow"
- maanantaina = "on Monday"
- kuudentena joulukuuta = "on the 6th of December" (Finnish independence day).
- tänä vuonna = "this year"
- tänä aamuna = "this morning"

(Note that for months, the inessive case is used instead)

In ancient Finnish, essive had a locative sense, which can still be seen in some words, one special case being words expressing comparative location:
- kotona = "at home" (koto being an archaic form of koti, still current in some dialects)
- ulkona = "outside; out of doors"
- takana = "behind (something)"
- lähempänä = "nearer"
- rannempana = "closer to the shore"
- lännempänä = "further west"

=== Translative ===
Characteristic ending -ksi added to the weak vowel stem. The ending is -kse- before a possessive suffix.

This is the counterpart of the essive, with the basic meaning of a change of state. Examples:
- maalaa se punaiseksi = "paint it red"
- tunnen itseni väsyneeksi = "I feel tired".
- se muuttui vedeksi = "it turned into water"
Also has a meaning similar to English "for a ..."
- "mäki on englanniksi 'hill'" = (literally:) "'hill' is English for mäki"
- toistaiseksi = "for the time being", "for now"
- suunnitelmia perjantaiksi = "plans for Friday"
- valmis perjantaiksi = "ready by Friday"
- mitä sinä teet työksesi? = "what do you do for a living?"
Rarely indicates location (going somewhere):
- lähemmäksi = "(moving) nearer to"
- rannemmaksi = "closer to the shore"
- lännemmäksi = "further west"

=== Instructive ===
Characteristic ending -n added usually (but not always) to plural stem.

This has the basic meaning of "by means of". It is a comparatively rarely used case, mostly used in fixed expressions and with a very few exceptions always in the plural.
- omin silmin = "with (my) own eyes"
- käsin = "by hand"
- jalokivin koristeltu = "decorated with jewels"
- rinta rinnan = "side by side"
- jalan = "by foot"
Many common adverbs have the form of a word in the instructive case, but these have developed into independent words
- harvoin = "rarely"
- hyvin = "well"
- niin = "thus"
The instructive also occurs in some fixed phrases in an adverbial sense
- keskimäärin = "on average"
- allapäin = "in low spirits"
It is also used with verbal second infinitives to mean "by ...ing", for example
- lentäen = "by flying", "by air"

=== Abessive ===
Characteristic ending -tta.

This has the basic meaning of "without". This case is rarely used by itself, especially in the spoken language, but is found in some expressions and proverbs.
- joka kuritta kasvaa, se kunniatta kuolee = "who grows up without discipline, dies without honor"
However, abessive is quite common in combination with the third infinitive (-ma-, -mä-).
- syömättä = "without eating"
- tekemättä = "without doing"
- ... lukuun ottamatta = "without taking into account..."

=== Comitative ===
Characteristic ending -ne (plus a possessive suffix for nouns but not for adjectives). This ending is added to the plural stem, even if the noun is singular, which may cause ambiguity.

This is a rarely used case, especially in the spoken language. The meaning is companionship: "in the company of" or affiliation: "together with", but stressing less importance than the main character.

- Talo kirjoineen = "The house with its books" or "book"
- Presidentti saapui kauniine vaimoineen = "The president arrived with his beautiful wife" or "wives"
- Hyvää pääsiäistä! Toivoo Matti perheineen = "Happy Easter! Wishes Matti with his family" or "Matti with his family wishes a happy easter"

== Others ==
=== Prolative ===
The prolative is almost exclusively found in a few fossilised forms in modern Finnish and is therefore not usually considered a living noun case (it is more common in Estonian but not considered a case there either). Its meaning is "by way of", some common examples being

- postitse = 'by post'
- puhelimitse = 'by phone'
- meritse = 'by sea'
- kiertoteitse = 'by indirect route', or 'in a roundabout way'
- ylitse = 'over'
- ohitseni = 'past me'

== The Finnish locative system ==
The Finnish language has eight locative cases, and some Eastern dialects symmetrify the system with the exessive case. These can be classified according to a three-way contrast of entering, residing in, and exiting a state, and there are three different systems of these cases. This system is similar to that of Estonian, and can be reconstructed to the Proto-Finnic locative system.

System	Entering	Residing in	Exiting
Inner	-(h)Vn "into" (illative)	-ssa "in" (inessive)	-sta "(out) from" (elative)
Outer	-lle "onto" (allative)	-lla "on" (adessive)	-lta "(away) from" (ablative)
State	-ksi "into as" (translative)	-na "as" (essive)	-nta "from being as" (exessive)

(The symbol "V" in the illative case denotes an epenthetic vowel, which is the preceding vowel in Finnish, e.g. tie → tiehen, and the -h- elides between two short vowels, e.g. ryhmä → ryhmähän → ryhmään.)

It is immediately noticeable from the table that the "exiting" forms (sta/lta/nta) have the same consonant as the "residing" forms (ssa/lla/na) added with the Finnish partitive case ending -ta. This may be traced into a Proto-Uralic ablative ending, which is preserved in what is now the partitive case. Also, the Finnish system is somewhat simpler than in the Hungarian language, where there is a separate system for "to the top", "on top", and "off from the top".

The exessive case is not used in standard Finnish, but it is found in Savo Finnish and Karelian.
