= Hakulinen =

Hakulinen is a Finnish surname. Notable people with the surname include:

- Anrei Hakulinen (born 1990), Finnish ice hockey player
- Auli Hakulinen, Finnish linguist
- Herman Hakulinen (1866–1928), Finnish politician
- Jussi Hakulinen (1964–2022), Finnish rock musician and singer-songwriter
- Lauri Hakulinen, Finnish linguist
- Rainar Hakulinen, (1918–1991), Finnish lichenologist
- Veikko Hakulinen, Finnish cross-country skier
