= Estonian grammar =

Grammar of the Estonian language

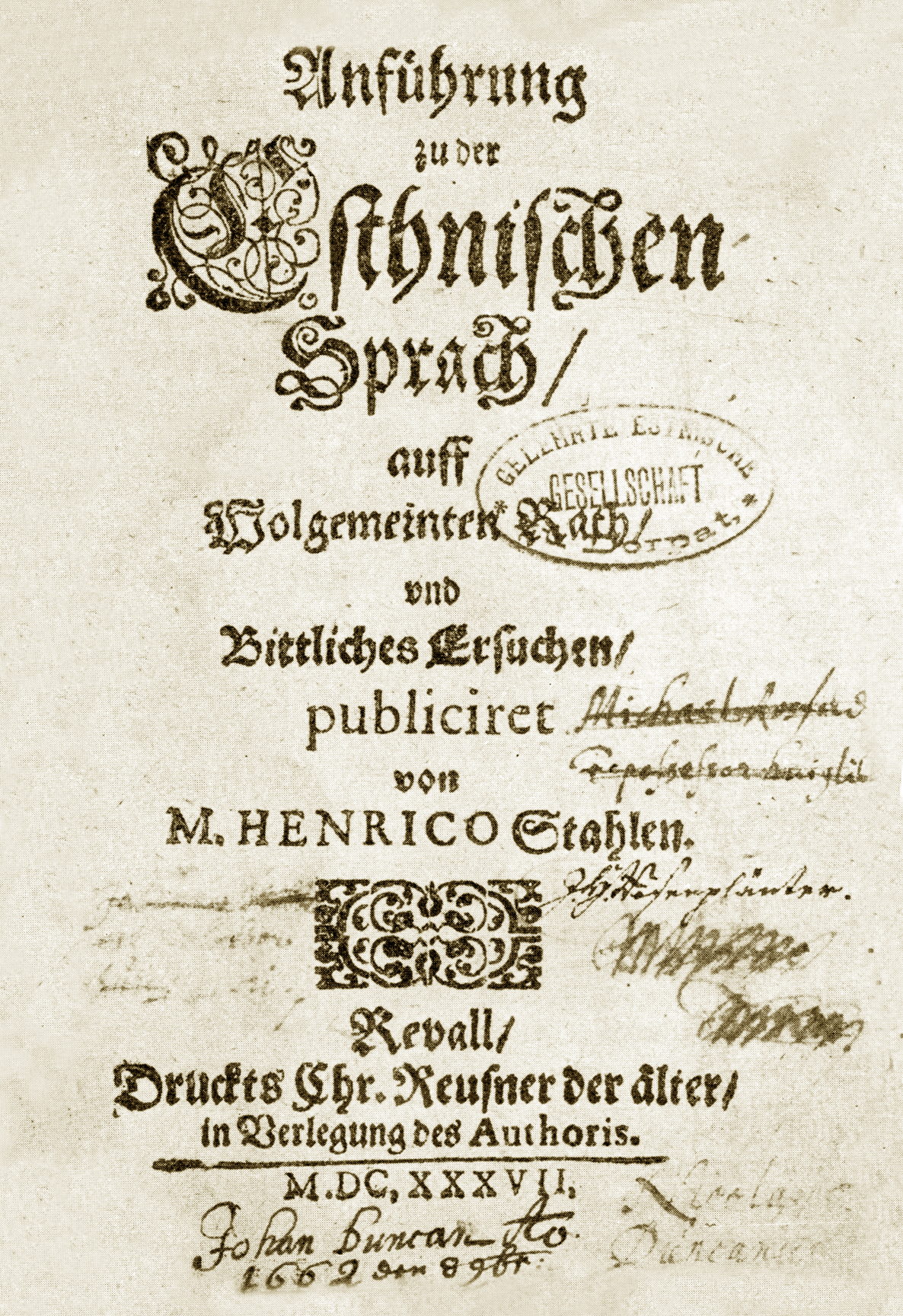
Estonian Grammar (1637) by Heinrich Stahl

Estonian grammar is the grammar of the Estonian language.

== Nouns ==
Case	Singular ending	Plural ending	Meaning/use	Answers to question; notes
Basic/grammatical cases
Nominative	∅ (with or without vowel)	-d	Subject, object of imperative, (in plural) complete (telic) object	Who? What?
Genitive	∅ (with vowel)	-de/-te	Possession, relation, (in singular) complete (telic) object	Whose? His?/Hers?
Partitive	-d, -t, ∅ (with vowel)	-id, -sid, ∅ (modified vowel)	Partial object, indefinite amount	Whom? Him?/Her?
Interior ("in") locative cases
Illative	-sse, -∅ (with vowel)	-desse/-tesse, -isse	In, into	Whither?
Inessive	-s	-des/-tes, -is	In, inside	Wherein?
Elative	-st	-dest/-test, -ist	Out of	Whence?
Exterior ("on") locative cases
Allative	-le	-dele/-tele, -ile	Towards, onto	Whither?
Adessive	-l	-del/-tel, -il	At, on, upon	Whereon?, on top of
Ablative	-lt	-delt/-telt, -ilt	From, off	Whereof?, off of
Other cases
Translative	-ks	-deks/-teks, -iks	Becoming, turning into	
Terminative	-ni	-deni/-teni	Till, until, up to, towards (a person, a thing)	
Essive	-na	-dena/-tena	Being, acting as, as people/things	
Abessive	-ta	-deta/-teta	Without, lacking, bereft of	
Comitative	-ga	-dega/-tega	With, in company of, in combination with	

Inflectional endings as listed below are added to the stem of a noun, which is formed from:

- singular genitive: singular cases except nominative and partitive, plural nominative,
- singular partitive: plural genitive,
- plural genitive: plural cases except nominative and partitive.

Singular nominative, singular genitive and singular partitive are not predictable and have to be taken from the vocabulary (gradation may also apply).

Singular genitive always ends in vowel. When formed from a stem that ends in consonant, it can take the following endings: -a, -e, -i, -o, -u.

Singular partitive can take the following endings: -d, -t, -a, -e, -i, -u.

Plural partitive is formed from either singular genitive or singular partitive and can take the following endings (some words have two forms):

- -id: one-syllable words with long vowels aa, ee, õõ, uu, öö, ää, two-syllable words with long vowels or endings -em, -en, -el, -er, -ar, -ur, -e, -ne, -s or singular genitive with one or three syllables, three-syllable words with endings -ne, -s,
- -sid: one-syllable words with long vowels ii, üü or a diphthong, two-syllable words with short vowels, three-syllable words with endings -um, -on, -er, -ar, -är, -ov, -nna,
- -e: words with singular partitive endings -i, -u, -j, or singular partitive ending -a with the preceding syllable containing u,
- -i: words with singular partitive ending -e, or singular partitive ending on consonant with singular genitive ending -e, or singular partitive ending -a with the preceding syllable containing vowels e, o, ä, ö, ü or a diphthong with one of these vowels as the first sound with the exception of ei, äi,
- -u: words with singular partitive ending -a with the preceding syllable containing vowels a, i, õ or diphthongs ei, äi.

Singular illative has a short form in some words. It can take the following endings: -de, -he, -hu, -a, -e, -i, -u. In case it takes the vowel ending, this vowel is the same as the ending vowel of the singular genitive form of the given word, but the vowel (if it is already long or a diphthong) or its preceding consonant (if the vowel is short and the consonant either short or long) is lengthened to the third degree and thus becomes overlong. If illative ends with -sesse, then the short form is -sse.

Plural illative, inessive, elative, allative, adessive, ablative, translative have a short form in some words. If the plural partitive ends with -id, then the short plural stem is this form without -d (instead of plural genitive with -de-); if it ends with a vowel, then the short plural stem is this form; if it ends with -sid, then the short plural cannot be formed.

Emphasis: noun + -gi (after a final voiced consonant or vowel) / -ki (after a final voiceless consonant).

New nouns can be derived from existing nouns, adjectives and verbs using suffixes like -ja (agent, from -ma infinitive), -mine (gerund, from -ma infinitive), -la, -nna, -tar, -ur, -stik, -ndik, -nik, -ik, -k, -ng, -lane, -line, -kene, -ke, -e, -ndus, -dus, -us, -is, -kond, -nd, -istu, -u.

=== Pronouns ===
Declension of personal pronouns
		1st	2nd	3rd
singular	nominative	m(in)a	s(in)a	t(em)a
singular	genitive	m(in)u	s(in)u	t(em)a
singular	partitive	mind	sind	teda
plural	nominative	m(ei)e	t(ei)e	n(em)ad
plural	genitive	m(ei)e	t(ei)e	nende
plural	partitive	meid	teid	neid

- reflexive (nominative – genitive – partitive, singular / plural)
  - ise – enese/enda – ennast/end / ise – eneste/endi – endid (-self)
- demonstrative (nominative – genitive – partitive, singular / plural)
  - see – selle – seda / need – nende – neid (this/that)
  - too – tolle – toda / nood – nonde – noid (yonder)
- interrogative (nominative – genitive – partitive)
  - kes – kelle – keda (who)
  - mis – mille – mida (what)
  - milline – millise – millist (which out of many)
  - kumb – kumma – kumba (which out of two)
- existential (nominative – genitive – partitive)
  - keegi – kellegi – kedagi (someone)
  - miski – millegi – midagi (something)
  - mõni – mõne – mõnda (some)
  - ükski – ühegi – ühtegi (one)
- free choice (nominative – genitive – partitive)
  - mingi – mingi – mingit (anyone/anything/any)
  - kumbki – kummagi – kumbagi (either)
- universal (nominative – genitive – partitive)
  - kõik – kõige – kõike (everyone/everything/each)
  - mõlemad – mõlema – mõlemat (both)

== Cases ==
There are traditionally considered to be 14 noun cases in Estonian:

#	Case	Singular		Plural	
		Example in Estonian	Example in English	Example in Estonian	Example in English
1	Nominative	ilus raamat	a beautiful book	ilusad raamatud	beautiful books (as subject or total object)
2	Genitive	ilusa raamatu	of a beautiful book; a beautiful book (as total object)	ilusate raamatute	of beautiful books;
3	Partitive	ilusat raamatut	a beautiful book (as a partial object)	ilusaid raamatuid	beautiful books (as a partial object)
4	Illative	ilusasse raamatusse	into a beautiful book	ilusatesse raamatutesse	into beautiful books
5	Inessive	ilusas raamatus	in a beautiful book	ilusates raamatutes	in beautiful books
6	Elative	ilusast raamatust	from a beautiful book	ilusatest raamatutest	from beautiful books
7	Allative	ilusale raamatule	onto a beautiful book	ilusatele raamatutele	onto beautiful books
8	Adessive	ilusal raamatul	on a beautiful book	ilusatel raamatutel	on beautiful books
9	Ablative	ilusalt raamatult	off a beautiful book	ilusatelt raamatutelt	off beautiful books
10	Translative	ilusaks raamatuks	[to turn] (in)to a beautiful book	ilusateks raamatuteks	[to turn] (in)to beautiful books
11	Terminative	ilusa raamatuni	up to a beautiful book	ilusate raamatuteni	up to beautiful books
12	Essive	ilusa raamatuna	as a beautiful book	ilusate raamatutena	as beautiful books
13	Abessive	ilusa raamatuta	without a beautiful book	ilusate raamatuteta	without beautiful books
14	Comitative	ilusa raamatuga	with a beautiful book	ilusate raamatutega	with beautiful books

Locative cases make up six or eight of these fourteen (depending on interpretation).

There are also some additional cases such as the instructive (jalgsi, "by foot"; käsitsi, "by hand"), or the similarly formed prolative (meritsi, "by the way of the sea"), which are not traditionally counted among the 14 grammatical cases.

== Adjectives ==
=== Inflection and derivation ===
Inflectional endings are added to the stem of an adjective, which is formed like the one for nouns. However, adjectives do not have terminative, essive, abessive, and comitative cases.

Comparison of adjectives
	Type
Degree	General
Positive	–
Comparative	-m
Superlative	-im/-em / kõige -m

The stem for the comparative and superlative forms is the singular genitive of an adjective; if a word has two syllables in the genitive or a vowel following -ke(se), then -ke(se) is left out and the last vowel in the stem changes to -e. The genitive and the partitive of the comparative itself are formed with -a and -at.

New adjectives can be derived from existing words by means of suffixes like:

-v (active present participle, from -ma infinitive),
-nud (active perfect participle, from -da infinitive),
-tav (passive present participle, from -tud participle),
-tud (passive perfect participle), and -lik, -line, -lane, -ne, -ke, -kas, -jas, -tu.

Antonyms can be formed by attaching eba- or mitte to an adjective. Eba- is considered to be the only derivational prefix in Estonian; as mitte can also occur as a separate word, mitte + adjective can be regarded as a compound rather than derivative. Alternatively, for an adjective formed from a noun or a verb, an antonym can often be constructed using the suffix -tu or -matu.

=== Articles ===
Estonian has no definite and indefinite articles. The function of the definite article can be performed by the demonstrative pronoun see ‘this’; and the function of the indefinite article can be performed by the indefinite pronoun üks, developed from the numeral ‘one’. (Pajusalu 2001)

See elu on vaid vaev ja viletsus.
this life be.3SG only trouble and misery
‘Life is only trouble and misery.’

Siia pidi üks maja tulema.
here.ILL must:PAST.3SG one house come:MINF
‘It is said that a house will be built here.‘

=== Agreement ===
Adjectival modifiers (including ordinals, demonstratives, and present participles) agree with their heads in case and number. In the terminative, essive, abessive, and comitative the modifier agrees only in number and remains in the genitive. See Case table above.

Most modifiers occur in the pre-noun position:

- a) demonstratives, e.g. see mees ‘this man’;
- b) adjectives, e.g. vana mees ‘old man’;
- c) quantifiers, e.g. kaks meest ‘two men’, kõik mehed ‘all men’;
- d) participles, e.g. jalutav mees ‘a walking man’,
- e) genitives, e.g. venna raamat ‘brother’s book’, eesti keel ‘Estonian language’;
- f) some oblique-case substantive modifiers, e.g. puust maja ‘wooden house’, nokaga müts ‘beaked cap’.

Post-noun substantive modifiers take the form of various kinds of adverbials, e.g. uks eluruumidesse ‘the door to dwelling rooms’, sõit linna ‘the drive to town’, vestlus sõpradega ‘conversation with friends’, mure laste pärast ‘worry about children’, tagatis eduks ‘key to success’, etc.

Adjectival modification
Case	Singular "big man"	Plural "big men"
Nominative	suur mees	suured mehed
Genitive	suure mehe	suurte meeste
Partitive	suurt meest	suuri mehi
Illative	suuresse mehesse	suurtesse meestesse
Inessiv(e)	suures mehes	suurtes meestes
Elative	suurest mehest	suurtest meestest
Allative	suurele mehele	suurtele meestele
Adessive	suurel mehel	suurtel meestel
Ablative	suurelt mehelt	suurtelt meestelt
Translative	suureks meheks	suurteks meesteks
Terminative	suure meheni	suurte meesteni
Essive	suure mehena	suurte meestena
Abessive	suure meheta	suurte meesteta
Comitative	suure mehega	suurte meestega

The non-agreement of the last four cases in Estonian is the manifestation of the postpositionality of the affixes of the above cases. Postpositionality implies that there is no need to repeat the case endings in coordinated phrases, e.g. naise(ga) ja mehega ‘with a man and a woman’. The above affixes were treated as postpositions in earlier grammars, and some grammarians still follow this tradition. Only the comitative evolved directly from a postposition; the other cases followed suit.

=== Pro-adjectives ===
- numeral (nominative – genitive – partitive, with noun in singular nominative for 1 and in singular partitive for others): null – nulli – nulli (0), üks – ühe – üht (1), kaks – kahe – kaht (2), kolm – kolme – kolme (3), neli – nelja – nelja (4), viis – viie – viit (5), kuus – kuue – kuut (6), seitse – seitsme – seitset (7), kaheksa – kaheksa – kaheksat (8), üheksa – üheksa – uheksat (9), kümme – kümne – kümmet (10), -teist(kümmend) – -teist(kümne) – -teist(kümmet) (11–19), -kümmend – -kümne – -kümmet (20–90), sada – saja – sadat (100), -sada – -saja – -sadat (200–900), - tuhat – - tuhande – - tuhandet (1,000–999,000), - miljon – - miljoni – - miljonit (1,000,000–999,000,000), - miljard – - miljardi – - miljardit (1,000,000,000); ordinal: esimene – esimese – esimest (first), teine – teise – teist (second), kolmas – kolmanda – kolmandat (third), cardinal_genitive-s – cardinal_genitive-nda – cardinal_genitive-ndat (others)
- demonstrative (nominative – genitive – partitive, singular / plural): niisugune – niisuguse – niisugust (this kind), see – selle – seda / need – nende – neid (this/that), too – tolle – toda / nood – nonde – noid (yonder)
- interrogative (nominative – genitive – partitive): missugune – missuguse – missugust (what kind), milline – millise – millist (which)
- existential (nominative – genitive – partitive): mingisugune – mingisuguse – mingisugust (some kind), mõni – mõne – mõnda (some)
- free choice (nominative – genitive – partitive): mingisugune – mingisuguse – mingisugust (any kind), ükskõik milline – ükskõik millise – ükskõik millist (any)
- universal (nominative – genitive – partitive): kõik – kõige – kõike (every kind), iga – iga – iga (every)

== Adpositions ==
The following lists are not exhaustive.

Postpositions

- with the genitive case and declinable (illative/allative – inessive/adessive – elative/ablative): alla – all – alt (under), ette – ees – eest (in front of), juurde – juures – juurest (at), järele – järel – järelt (after), keskele – keskel – keskelt (in the middle), kohale – kohal – kohalt (above), kõrvale – kõrval – kõrvalt (beside), kätte – käes – käest (in the hand of), lähedale – lähedal – lähedalt (near), peale – peal – pealt (on), sisse – sees – seest (in), taha – taga – tagant (behind), vahele – vahel – vahelt (between), äärde – ääres – äärest (by)
- with the genitive case and non-declinable: eest / jaoks (for), järgi (according to), kaudu (via), kohta (about), pärast (on account of), vastas (vis-à-vis), vastu (against), üle (over), ümber (around)
- with the partitive case: mööda (along)
- with the elative case: alla (down), läbi (through), peale / saadik (since)

Prepositions

- with the genitive case: läbi (through), peale (besides), üle (over), ümber (around)
- with the partitive case: alla (down), enne (before), kesk / keset (amid), mööda (along), piki (alongside), pärast (after), vastu (against)
- with the terminative case: kuni (until)
- with the abessive case: ilma (without)
- with the comitative case: koos / ühes (with)

== Verbs ==
The inflectional endings as listed below are added to the stem of a verb, which is formed from:

- indicative mood active voice singular first person of positive present tense (by dropping -n): indicative mood active voice of present tense, conditional mood active voice of present tense, imperative mood active voice singular second person of present tense,
- -ma infinitive (by dropping -ma; if the stem ends with a consonant, an additional -i- is added in the singular third person of the imperfect or an additional -e- is added in the singular nominative of the participle, the consonant is doubled if it was short and preceding a short vowel; if the stem ends with -e while being two-syllable or if it ends with a long vowel, then the -s- is left out in all numbers and persons, ei is changed to i, a long vowel becomes short and o, ö are changed to õ): indicative mood active voice of positive imperfect, quotative mode active voice of present tense,
- -da infinitive (by dropping -da / -ta / -a; long final l, r become short, in spoken language -nud is shortened to -nd): indicative mood active voice of negative imperfect, indicative mood active voice of pluperfect, imperative mood active voice of present tense except singular second person, active voice of perfect,
- participle of passive voice perfect (by dropping -tud): passive voice.

Present tense form and -tud participle are derived from the infinitives on the basis of gradation.

-ma infinitive indicates real action, i.e. action that does happen, has happened, or will happen. It can be declined: -ma (illative), -mas (inessive), -mast (elative), -maks (translative), -mata (abessive). The verb that precedes it also usually implies real action: harjunud lugema ‘accustomed to reading’, lähen lugema ‘I go to read’, käib vaatamas ‘goes looking’, olen valmis/nõus aitama ‘I am ready/in agreement to help’, saan hakkama ‘I can manage’.

-da infinitive indicates hypothetical action, i.e. the idea of the action rather than real action. It can be declined: -des (inessive). It is used in the following cases:

- In a compound verb when it refers only to the idea of the action: tahan magada ‘I want to sleep’, oskan lugeda ‘I know how to read’, saan hakata ‘I can start’, võid küsida ‘you can ask’, õhus oli tunda ‘it could be felt in the air’,
- In a subordinate clause that refers only to the idea of the action: et paremini näha ’in order to see better’, kui homme hommikul kell kuus ärgata ‘if waking up tomorrow morning at six’, kui mõelda asjalikult ‘if you think about it’.
- As part of a participle where it refers only to the idea of the action: kasutada olev ‘able to be used’, aimata laskev ‘unpredictable’.

=== Verb derivation ===
The following suffixes add meaning to a stem.

-ta-
creates a verb from a noun
makes a verb transitive
-u-, -i-
reflexive
-el-, -le-
reciprocal
-ne-
translative
-ata-
momentane
-el-, -skle-
frequentative
-tse-
continuous

=== Conjugation paradigms ===
Regular types
		I	II	III	IV	V	VI
ma-infinitive		elama	õppima	hüppama	riidlema	söötma	tulema
Past	1st singular	elasin	õppisin	hüppasin	riidlesin	söötsin	tulin
Past	3rd singular	elas	õppis	hüppas	riidles	söötis	tuli
tud-participle		elatud	õpitud	hüpatud	riieldud	söödetud	tuldud
Present passive		elatakse	õpitakse	hüpatakse	riieldakse	söödetakse	tullakse
da-infinitive		elada	õppida	hüpata	riielda	sööta	tulla
Imperative	2nd plural	elage	õppige	hüpake	riielge	söötke	tulge

=== List of endings ===
Conjugation of verbs
				Tense							
				Present		Imperfect		Perfect		Pluperfect	
Mood	Voice	Number	Person	Positive	Negative	Positive	Negative	Positive	Negative	Positive	Negative
Indicative
Indicative	Active										
Indicative	Active	Singular	First	-n	ei –	-sin	ei -nud	olen -nud	ei ole -nud	olin -nud	ei olnud -nud
Indicative	Active	Singular	Second	-d	ei –	-sid	ei -nud	oled -nud	ei ole -nud	olid -nud	ei olnud -nud
Indicative	Active	Singular	Third	-b	ei –	-s	ei -nud	on -nud	ei ole -nud	oli -nud	ei olnud -nud
Indicative	Active	Plural	First	-me	ei –	-sime	ei -nud	oleme -nud	ei ole -nud	olime -nud	ei olnud -nud
Indicative	Active	Plural	Second	-te	ei –	-site	ei -nud	olete -nud	ei ole -nud	olite -nud	ei olnud -nud
Indicative	Active	Plural	Third	-vad	ei –	-sid	ei -nud	on -nud	ei ole -nud	olid -nud	ei olnud -nud
Indicative	Passive	/		-takse	ei -ta	-ti	ei -tud	on -tud	ei ole -tud	oli -tud	ei olnud -tud
Conditional
Conditional	Active										
Conditional	Active	Singular	First	-ksin	ei -ks	/		oleksin -nud	ei oleks -nud	/	
Conditional	Active	Singular	Second	-ksid	ei -ks	/		oleksid -nud	ei oleks -nud	/	
Conditional	Active	Singular	Third	-ks	ei -ks	/		oleks -nud	ei oleks -nud	/	
Conditional	Active	Plural	First	-ksime	ei -ks	/		oleksime -nud	ei oleks -nud	/	
Conditional	Active	Plural	Second	-ksite	ei -ks	/		oleksite -nud	ei oleks -nud	/	
Conditional	Active	Plural	Third	-ksid	ei -ks	/		oleksid -nud	ei oleks -nud	/	
Conditional	Passive	/		-taks	ei -taks	/		oleks -tud	ei oleks -tud	/	
Imperative
Imperative	Active										
Imperative	Active	Singular	Second	–	ära –	/		/		/	
Imperative	Active	Singular	Third	-gu	ärgu -gu	/		olgu -nud	ärgu olgu -nud	/	
Imperative	Active	Plural	First	-gem	ärgem -gem	/		/		/	
Imperative	Active	Plural	Second	-ge	ärge -ge	/		/		/	
Imperative	Active	Plural	Third	-gu	ärgu -gu	/		olgu -nud	ärgu olgu -nud	/	
Imperative	Passive	/		-tagu	ärgu -tagu	/		olgu -tud	ärgu olgu -tud	/	
Quotative
Quotative	Active	/		-vat	ei -vat	/		olevat -nud	ei olevat -nud	/	
Quotative	Passive	/		-tavat	ei -tavat	/		olevat -tud	ei olevat -tud	/	

Emphasis: verb + -gi (after a final voiced consonant or vowel) / -ki (after a final voiceless consonant), verb + küll (positive), verb + mitte (negative).

== Adverbs ==
Inflectional endings as listed below are added to the stem of an adverb, which is formed from:

- singular genitive of an adjective (-sti, -ti, -ldi, -li, -kesi): genetival type,
- singular ablative of an adjective (-lt; some are declinable in allative, adessive, ablative): ablatival type.

Some adverbs are special words – original or vestigial forms of an ancient instructive case.

Pro-adverbs

- demonstrative (illative/allative – inessive/adessive – elative/ablative): siia – siin – siit (here), sinna – seal – sealt (there), nüüd (now), siis (then), seega (thus), seepärast (therefore)
- interrogative (illative/allative – inessive/adessive – elative/ablative): kuhu – kus – kust (where), millal (when), kuidas (how), miks (why)
- existential (illative/allative – inessive/adessive – elative/ablative): kuhugi – kuskil – kuskilt (somewhere), kunagi (sometime), kuidagi (somehow)
- free choice (illative/allative – inessive/adessive – elative/ablative): ükskõik kuhu – ükskõik kus – ükskõik kust (anywhere), ükskõik millal (anytime), igatahes (anyhow)
- universal (illative/allative – inessive/adessive – elative/ablative): igale poole – igal pool – igalt poolt (everywhere), alati (always)

Comparison of adverbs
	Type	
Degree	Genetival	Ablatival
Positive	–	-lt
Comparative	-mini	-malt
Superlative	kõige -mini	kõige -malt

== Grammatical processes ==
=== Consonant gradation ===
Estonian consonant gradation is a grammatical process that affects obstruent consonants at the end of the stressed syllable of a word. Gradation causes consonants in a word to alternate between two grades, termed "strong" and "weak", depending on the grammar. Some grammatical forms trigger the weak grade, while others retain the strong grade. It is not predictable which form will have which grade; this must simply be memorised. Not all words show gradation. In particular, words with stems of three or more syllables generally do not gradate, nor do words with stems of one syllable.

Gradation correlates with the appearance of extra length on a syllable. When a syllable is long, the strong grade will always be accompanied by extra length. The weak grade may or may not have extra length, depending on other factors. These are mentioned at Estonian phonology – Suprasegmental length. Some words show gradation only through the presence or absence of extra length, and the consonants themselves do not change. In this article, extra length is shown with a backtick ` before the vowel of the syllable.

The gradation patterns of geminate (long) consonants are relatively simple:

- Standing alone after a short vowel, the strong grade appears as a double voiceless consonant, while a single voiceless consonant appears in the weak grade.
- After a long vowel, or in a consonant cluster, the strong grade appears with a single voiceless consonant, while a voiced consonant appears in the weak grade.
- Long ss only gradates when it appears at the end of a cluster, with s appearing in the weak grade.

Strong	Weak	Example
pp	p	s`epp: sepa
tt	t	v`õtta: võtan
kk	k	h`akkama: hakata
p	b	k`upja: kubjas, k`ilp: kilbi
t	d	s`aatev: saadan, k`artma: kardan
k	g	v`ilkuma: vilgun
ss	s	k`irss: kirsi

Patterns for single plosives are more varied and unpredictable. The weak grade may involve disappearance of the consonant altogether, with further consequences for vowels and extra length.

Strong	Weak	Example	Notes
b	v	k`aebama: kaevata	
b	∅	tuba: t`oa	When next to u.
d, t	∅	`aed: aia, l`eht: lehe	Voiceless t appears in the cluster ht.
d, t	j	rada: raja	When followed by a and preceded by a short vowel other than e or i.
g, k	∅	`arg: ara, lugema: l`oen, h`ahk: haha	Voiceless k appears in the clusters hk and sk.
g, k	j	m`ärg: märja	When followed by a or e and preceded by l or r which is preceded by e, ä or ü.

There are also four special assimilative patterns:

Strong	Weak	Example
mb	mm	h`amba: hammas
nd	nn	k`andma: kannan
ld	ll	p`õld: põllu
rd	rr	k`ord: korra

When a consonant is reduced to zero in the weak grade, this may cause the vowels of the two adjacent syllables to come together. These vowels undergo several changes:

- If the first vowel is long, it is shortened. Examples: r`oog: r`oa, n`eedma: n`ean.
- If either vowel is i, u or ü, it is lowered to e, o or ö respectively. Examples: nuga: n`oa, s`aagima: s`aen, süsi: s`öe.
- If the first vowel is a diphthong ending in e, the e becomes j. Examples: p`oeg: poja, 'aeglema: ajelda.
- If the first vowel is a diphthong ending in u, the u becomes v. Examples: h`aug: havi.
- If the first vowel is a diphthong ending in any other sound, the second vowel is removed if it is identical. Examples: t`eadma: t`ean, l`iug: l`iu.

=== Assibilation ===
Assibilation is a change that happened in Proto-Finnic: the sequence ti became si. This change is no longer productive or predictable, but a fair number of nouns still display the effects in certain forms. The effect is visible in that sometimes s appears where there would otherwise be a t or d. This also creates new variants of the gradation patterns mentioned above, with s appearing in some of the forms in both the strong and weak grade.

For example:

- käsi, genitive singular käe, illative singular kätte, partitive plural käsi.
- uus, genitive singular uue, illative singular uude, partitive plural uusi.
- vars, genitive singular varre, illative singular varde, partitive plural varsi.
- kaas, genitive singular kaane, illative singular kaande, partitive plural kaasi. Also an example of another change that happened in some words, in which n disappeared before s. Consequently, there is no n in the forms that have assibilation.
- kolmas, genitive singular kolmanda. Here, too, n disappeared before s.
- kaks, genitive singular kahe, illative singular kahte. In this particular case, ht becomes ks where assibilation occurred.
- minema, first-person singular present lähen, first-person singular past läksin. Same as above.

== Syntax ==
The neutral word order in Estonian is subject–verb–object (SVO).

However, as one would expect from an agglutinative language, the word order is quite free and non-neutral word order can be used to stress some parts of the sentence or in poetic texts, as in Finnish grammar. For example, consider the sentence mees tappis karu which means ‘(a/the) man killed (a/the) bear’ and uses the neutral SVO word order. The sentence can be rephrased using OVS word order as karu tappis mees—a normal Estonian sentence that could be more precisely translated as ‘it was (a/the) man who killed the bear’, i. e., the speaker emphasizes that the killer was a man, probably assuming the listener knows that a bear was killed. The other four word orders (tappis mees karu, tappis karu mees, mees karu tappis, karu mees tappis) are also possible in certain contexts, especially if more words are added to the three-word sentences. The following data (4–24, 50–72) are sourced from (Tauli, 1983) and (Erelt, 2009) at the University of Tartu.

Sometimes the forms of verbs, nouns and adjectives in the sentence are not enough to determine the subject and object, e. g. mehed tapsid karud (‘the men killed the bears’) or isa tappis karu (‘father killed the bear’)—in the first sentence because in plural, the nominative case is used in Estonian both for subject and telic object, and in the second sentence because in singular, the nominative, genitive and partitive forms of the word isa are the same, as well as those of the word karu (unlike the word mees which has different forms: sg. nom. mees, sg. gen. mehe, sg. part. meest). In such sentences, word order is the only thing that distinguishes the subject and the object: the listener presumes that the former noun (mehed, isa) is the subject and the latter (karud, karu) is the object. In such situations, the speaker cannot interchange the subject and the object for emphasis (unless it is obvious from the context which noun is the subject).

=== Basic clause patterns ===
There are two basic patterns of clauses in Estonian: normal and inverted clauses (cf. also Erelt 2003, 2005a). In a normal clause the basic syntactic order is SVX (subject – verb – nonsubject). The subject is unmarked, that is, it stands in the nominative, and the verb usually agrees with the subject in person and number. An inverted clause has the initial row XVS (besides a spoken XSV). The clause opens not with the subject but with an adverbial or oblique, experiential clauses with an object in exceptional cases. If there is a subject-NP in the clause, it is usually indefinite. If the subject-NP is a mass noun or a count noun in the plural, quantitative indefiniteness may be optionally marked by the partitive. (5,7) In the (non-contrastive) negative clause the use of the partitive is obligatory, (e.g. ex. 8). In clauses without a nominative subject the verb is always in the 3rd person singular. In the inverted clause olema ‘be’ is the most common verb. The main types of inverted clauses include existential, possessive, experiential clauses, clauses of state and source-marking resultative clauses. In existential clauses, as in (4)–(8), the clause-initial constituent is an adverbial of location (or time), and the clause performs a presentative function. In possessive clauses the possessor is expressed as a locative phrase. The latter is represented by the nominal in the adessive case (9).

Aias olid / kasvasid lilled.
garden:INE be:PAST:3PL / grow:PAST:3PL flower:PL.NOM
‘Flowers were / were growing in the garden.’

Aias oli / kasvas lilli.
garden:INE be:PAST.3SG / grow:PAST.3SG flower.PL.PTV
lit. ‘There were / were growing some flowers in the garden.’

Klaasis oli / loksus vesi.
glass:INE be:PAST.3SG / slosh:PAST.3SG water.NOM
‘Some water was sloshing in the glass.’

Klaasis oli / loksus vett.
glass:INE be:PAST.3SG / slosh:PAST.3SG water.PTV
‘Some water was sloshing in the glass.’

Aias ei olnud / ei kasvanud lilli.
garden:INE NEG be:PPP / neg grow:PPP flower.PL.PTV
‘There were no flowers / no flowers were growing in the garden.’

The possessor is typically animate, as in (9), but it may be also inanimate, as in Autol on neli ratast ‘The car has four wheels’. Estonian makes no distinction in the expression of permanent and temporal possession. Occasionally, possessive constructions may be formed according to the model of normal clauses, that is, encoding the possessor as the subject and using a special verb, such as omama, evima ‘have’ (10). The frequency of the construction is on the increase. The pattern of the normal clause is also used to form the belong-possession, using the olema-verb and the genitive possessor together with the pronoun oma ‘one’s own’ (11) or the special kuuluma-verb ‘belong’ (12). Experiential clauses can be formed according to the pattern of possessive clauses, so that the experiencer is expressed by the clause-initial oblique in the adessive, and the ‘possessed’ state is expressed by the subject-NP, as in (13). This kind of state can be expressed also by the predicate adjective (14).

Jaanil on vend.
Jaan:ADE be.3SG brother.NOM
‘Jaan has a brother.’

Jaan omab/evib autot.
Jaan have:3SG car:PTV
‘Jaan has a car.’

See auto on Jaani oma.
this car be.3SG Jaan.GEN own
‘This car belongs to Jaan.’

See auto kuulub Jaanile.
this car belong:3SG Jaan:ALL
‘This car belongs to Jaan.’

Jaanil oli / hakkas hirm.
Jaan.ADE be:PAST.3SG / become:PAST.3SG fear.NOM
‘Jaan was/became afraid.’

Jaanil oli / hakkas piinlik.
Jaan:ADE be:PAST.3SG / become:PAST.3SG embarrassing.NOM
‘Jaan was/became embarrassed.’

The inverted clause pattern is also used in the case of some experiential verbs. In the case of some of them (e.g. meeldima ‘like’) the experiencer has to be encoded as the allative oblique (15), in others (huvitama ‘take an interest in’, hämmastama ‘amaze’, etc.) as the direct object in the partitive case (16). Most experiential verbs take a nominative experiencer, that is, the normal clause pattern, as in (17). In clauses of “state” the clause-initial adverbial of location or time is optional. The predicate may be nominal, as in (18, 19), or verbal (20). The “source-marking resultative clause” (Erelt 2005b) is a marginal type of the resultative clause, where not the resultant state (goal) is marked, as in the normal resultative clause (22), but an entity that changes its state (21).

Siimule meeldivad lapsed.
Siim:ALL like:3PL child:PL.NOM
‘Siim loves children.’

Mind huvitab teie arvamus.
I:PTV interest:3SG you.GEN opinion.NOM
‘I’m interested in your opinion.’

Ma armastan sind.
I.NOM love:1SG you:PTV
‘I love you.’

Väljas on kõva tuul.
outside be.3SG strong.NOM wind.NOM
‘Outside the wind is strong.’

(Väljas) on külm / läheb külmaks.
outside be.3SG cold.NOM / get:3SG cold:TRANSL
‘It’s cold outside/it is getting cold.’

(Väljas) müristab.
outside thunder:3SG
‘It’s thundering outside.’

Poisist kasvas mees.
boy.ELA grow:PAST.3SG man.NOM
‘The boy grew into a man.’

Poiss kasvas meheks.
boy.NOM grow:PAST.3SG man:TRANSL
‘The boy grew into a man.’

=== Case marking ===
Isa viis last kooli.
father take:PAST.3SG child:PTV school.ILL
‘The father was taking the child to school.’

Isa viis lapse/lapsed kooli.
father take:PAST.3SG child.GEN/PL.NOM school.ILL
‘The father took the child/children to school.

The Estonian language has no secondary or indirect object. A direct object can be in the partitive (partial object) (23), or in the genitive or nominative (total object) (24). In the affirmative clause the total object refers to definite quantity and the clause expresses a perfective activity. If at least one of the conditions is not met, the partitive is used, for example, the clause (23) denotes an imperfective activity; the clause Ta jõi vett ja hakkas siis sööma ‘He drank some water and then started to eat’ denotes a perfective activity but an indefinite quantity. In the negative clause only the partial object can be used, e.g. Isa ei viinud last kooli ‘The father didn’t take the child to school’. Some verbs, such as the verbs of cognition, only take the partial object also in the affirmative, e.g. Isa armastab lapsi ‘Father loves children’. The total object in Estonian does not express the perfective aspect as strongly as in the Finnish language, and for this reason perfective adverbs are often used along with it. The total object is predominantly in the genitive. The nominative is used if the object is in the plural as in (24) or if there is (normally) no subject in the clause, and the object happens to be the most central argument in the clause, i.e. if the verb is in the imperative mood, e.g. Vii laps kooli! ‘Take the child to school!’, impersonal, e.g. Laps viiakse kooli ‘The child is taken to school’, or the da-infinitive (except cases where the da-infinitive acts also as the object), e.g. Isa ülesanne oli laps kooli viia ‘The father’s task was to take the child to school’ Measure adverbials behave similarly to the object in that they occur in the nominative/genitive or the partitive roughly under similar circumstances, e.g. Ta suusatas viis [nom] kilomeetrit / ühe [gen] kilomeetri ‘He skied five kilometres / one kilometre’ – Ta ei suusatanud ühte [part] kilomeetritki ‘He didn’t ski not a single kilometre’; Ootasin pool [nom] tundi / ühe [gen] tunni ‘I waited for half an hour / an hour’ – Ma ei oodanud ühte [part] minutitki ‘I didn’t wait even a minute’.

=== Word order in the clause ===
As the basic structure in the normal clause is SVX and in the inverted clause it is XVS, the pattern of subject-verb-object actually dominates, but also verb-subject-object occurs very frequently. The word order is flexible, that is, pragmatic order variants are allowed in addition to the basic order. However, one can observe the following trends in the location of the verb: In non-negated declarative main clauses, not limited to formal registers, the finite verb tends to retain the second position (V2 word order) in all the thematic variants (50–51) (cf. Tael 1990, Ehala 2006). The rule of subject-object-verb word order has decreased in the history of this Uralic language. Nevertheless, the nonfinite verb remains in clause-final standard position and the finite verb can be located at the end of the clause in negative clauses if the clause does not begin with the subject (52), in questions (53), and in some subordinate clauses like the neutrally written relative one (54). The positioning of the verb at the beginning of the clause and the resulting inversion can mark a speech act function (55)–(58) or can be used in narrative texts rendering past activities, e.g. (59) (cf. Lindström 2001b).

Meie pere joob hommikukohvi kodus.
our family drink:3SG morning_coffee.PTV home:INE
{} S V O A

Hommikukohvi joob meie pere kodus.
morning_coffee.PTV drink.3SG our family home:INE
O V {} S A
‘Our family drinks morning coffee at home.’

Kodus ma hommikul putru ei söö.
home:INE I morning:ADE pudding.PTV neg eat.NEGV
‘At home I don’t eat pudding.’

Kuidas te hommikul nii ruttu siia jõudsite?
how you morning:ADE so quickly here.ILL get:PAST:2PL
‘How did you get here so quickly in the morning?’

Ma tunnen seda meest, kellega Jaan rääkis.
I know:1SG this:PTV man:PTV who:COM Jaan talk:PAST.3SG
‘I know the man that Jaan talked to.’

On ema kodus?
be.3SG mother home:INE
‘Is the mother at home?’

Käi sa vahepeal kodus ära!
go.imp.2SG you meanwhile home:INE away
‘Go home in the meanwhile!’

Läheks nad ometi minema!
go:COND they at_last away
‘If only they would leave at last!’

Oled sina alles tubli!
be:2SG you so diligent
‘How come you’re so diligent!

Istun mina eile oma kabinetis ja kirjutan aruannet.
sit:1SG I yesterday own study:INE and write:1SG report:PTV
‘Yesterday I was sitting in my study and writing the report.’

=== Interrogatives ===
Polar questions are formed by means of the clause-initial interrogative particles kas (60) or ega (in negative clauses, as in [61]), verb fronting (62), or rising intonation (63). In spoken language questions can be formed also by the clause-final particle või, which developed from the disjunctive conjunction (64) (cf. Lindström 2001a). Questions begin with an interrogative word (interrogative pro-forms or kas (yes/no-question), eks (yes-question), ega (no-question)), followed by the SVO word order (in spoken language, interrogative words are sometimes left out, but instead there is either a change in intonation or VSO word order); answers: jah/jaa (yes), ei (no). An adjective precedes the noun it modifies. An adverb of time precedes an adverb of place.

Content questions are formed by means of interrogative pronouns and pro-adverbs, which are positioned at the beginning of the sentence (64, 65)(WH-fronting):

Kas sa tuled täna koju?
Q you come:2SG today home.ILL
‘Will you come home today?’

Ega sa (ei) tule täna koju?
NEG.Q you (NEG) come.NEGV today home.ILL
‘Won’t you come home today?’

On sul täna aega?
be.3SG you:ADE today time.PTV
‘Do you have any time today?’

Sa armastad mind?
you love:2SG I:PTV
‘Do you love me?’

Ta läks ära või?
s/he leave:PAST.3SG away or
‘Did s/he leave or?’

Kes sa oled?
who you be:2SG
‘Who are you?’

Kuhu te lähete?
where you.PL go:2PL
‘Where are you going?’

=== Negation ===
Clausal negation in Estonian is expressed by means of the negative particle ei, which usually precedes the verb, e.g. (67). The particle ei is historically the 3sg form of the previous negative auxiliary. Standard clausal negation is asymmetric, that is, the structure of the negative construction differs from the affirmative not only by the presence of the negative particle but in various other ways, too, first and foremost by the non-finiteness of the main verb (Miestamo 2000). In Estonian the main verb does not carry inflections of the person and the number appearing in the connegative form in the present and in the past participle in the past (see example [67]). The other secondary modifications of standard negation include changes in case marking and word order. In a negative clause direct objects appear only in the partitive case. In the case of the inverted type of clause the same applies to the subject (cf. 2). The connegative form of the verb may be located at the end of the clause in negative clauses (cf. 6). In the imperative and the jussive prohibition is expressed by the partially inflected negative auxiliary ära (2sg), ärge (2pl), ärgem (1pl), ärgu (3sg/pl) together with the imperative form of the main verb (68). Unlike the negative particle ei, the auxiliary verb ära may be separated from the main verb by other words (69). In the case of constituent negation the scope of negation is marked by emphasis and optionally by the negative particle mitte (70, 71). The particle is placed immediately before the negated constituents, whereas the verb is optionally (but in the case of negated indefinites obligatorily) also in the negative form. The particle mitte is also used to express negation within an infinitive clause (72).

Täna ajalehed ei ilmu/ilmunud.
today newspaper:PL NEG appear:NEGV.PPP
‘Today newspapers are not/were not published.’

On DO Fronting:

Ära tee rumalusi!
IMP.NEG make.IMP.2SG stupid_thing.PL.PTV
‘Don’t act stupid!’

Ära homme tule!
IMP.NEG tomorrow come.IMP.2SG
‘Don’t come tomorrow!’

Constituent negation:

See ei ole / see on (mitte) raha, vaid tunnustus.
it NEG be.NEGV / it be.3SG (NEG) money but recognition
‘It is not the money but recognition.’

Mind ei häiri (*häirib) (mitte) miski.
I:PTV NEG disturb.NEGV (*disturb:3SG) (NEG) something
‘Nothing can disturb me.’

Palun teid mitte karjuda!
beg:1SG you:PTV NEG shout:DINF
‘Don’t shout please!’

=== Modifiers ===
See Adjectival Agreement.

=== Conjunctions ===
- aga (but)
- et (that)
- ja (and)
- kas (whether)
- kui (if)
- nagu (as)
- sest (because)
- või (or)
