= Sociative case =

Grammatical case

In grammar, the sociative case is a grammatical case in Uralic languages such as Finnish and Hungarian; as well as Tamil, and Malayalam languages that can express the person in whose company (cf. Latin socius) an action is carried out, or to any belongings of people which take part in an action (together with their owners). In other words, it is a case "that typically marks accompaniment or association."

In 19th Century textbooks, sociative case is mentioned as having existed in English grammar, but in Modern English language, the speaker must use context to convey the tone of the message of pejorative association, as in the lyrics of Invisible Sun by The Police: "I face the day with my head caved in: Looking like something that the cat brought in."

== Hungarian ==
In Hungarian, this case is usually denoted by the suffixes -stul and -stül, depending on vowel harmony; it can also have a -mal ending. This case is archaic and nowadays the instrumental-comitative case is usually used instead. Nevertheless, it can be used also in modern Hungarian to express a slight pejorative tone against a person. Here are a few examples:

- Karácsonykor egy fillér nélkül, kölyköstül állított be az anyósához "Without a dime, she wound up in her mother-in-law's house at Christmas with her kids".

The use of the sociative case kölyköstül ("with her kids") signifies the speaker's contempt. The case appears also in some commonly used expressions, which survived the general obsolescence of the sociative case:

- Ruhástul ugrott a medencébe "He jumped into the pool with his clothes on"
- A fenevad szőröstül-bőröstül felfalta a védtelen kis nyuszit "The monster devoured the helpless little bunny neck and crop".

== Tamil ==
In some spoken dialects of Tamil, the sociative case takes the endings -ஓடு (-ōṭu) or -உடன் (-uṭan).

It is related to the instrumental case but not identical to it. In contrast to the sociative case, the instrumental case usually denotes the means of action and takes the ending -ஆல் (-āl).

Harold F. Schiffman noted the similarities between the sociative cases of Tamil and Hungarian.
