= Grammatical case =

Categorization of nouns and modifiers by function

A grammatical case is a category of nouns and noun modifiers (determiners, adjectives, participles, and numerals) that corresponds to one or more potential grammatical functions for a nominal group in a wording. In various languages, nominal groups consisting of a noun and its modifiers belong to one of a few such categories. For instance, in English, one says I see them and they see me: the nominative pronouns I / they represent the perceiver, and the accusative pronouns them/me represent the phenomenon perceived. Here, nominative and accusative are cases, that is, categories of pronouns corresponding to the functions they have in representation.

English has largely lost its inflected case system but personal pronouns still have three cases, which are simplified forms of the nominative, accusative (including functions formerly handled by the dative), and genitive cases. They are used with personal pronouns: Nominative case (I, you, he, she, it, we, they, who, whoever), objective case (me, you, him, her, it, us, them, whom, whomever), and possessive case (my, mine; your, yours; his; her, hers; its; our, ours; their, theirs; whose; whosever). Forms such as I, he, and we are used for the subject ("I kicked John"), and forms such as me, him, and us are used for the object ("John kicked me").

As a language evolves, cases can merge (for instance, in Ancient Greek, the locative case merged with the dative), a phenomenon known as syncretism.

Languages such as Sanskrit, Latin, and Russian have extensive case systems, with nouns, pronouns, adjectives, and determiners all inflecting (usually by means of different suffixes) to indicate their case. The number of cases differs between languages: For example, modern Standard Arabic has three, so does modern English but only for pronouns; Hungarian is among those with the most, with potentially 18 cases.

Commonly encountered cases include nominative, accusative, dative and genitive. A role that one of those languages marks by case is often marked in English with a preposition. For example, the English prepositional phrase with (his) foot (as in "John kicked the ball with his foot") might be rendered in Russian using a single noun in the instrumental case, or in Ancient Greek as τῷ ποδί (tôi podí, meaning "the foot") with both words – the definite article, and the noun πούς (poús) "foot" – changing to dative form.

More formally, case has been defined as "a system of marking dependent nouns for the type of relationship they bear to their heads". Cases should be distinguished from thematic roles such as agent and patient. They are often closely related, and in languages such as Latin, several thematic roles are realised by a somewhat fixed case for deponent verbs, but cases are a syntagmatic / phrasal category, and thematic roles are the function of a syntagma / phrase in a larger structure. Languages having cases often exhibit free word order, as thematic roles are not required to be marked by position in the sentence.

== History ==
It is widely accepted that the Ancient Greeks had a certain idea of the forms of a name in their own language. A fragment of Anacreon seems to prove this. Grammatical cases were first recognized by the Stoics and from some philosophers of the Peripatetic school. The advancements of those philosophers were later employed by the philologists of the Library of Alexandria.

Aristotle recognized the gender of nouns and their related endings, but it was with the Stoics and, subsequently, with the grammarians of the Hellenistic period that a systematic and complete grouping of the morphology of nouns and their declensions in Ancient Greek was achieved. Of particular importance is the work of Dionysius Thrax The Art of Grammar (2nd century BCE), which represents the first true grammar in the modern sense ever written about an Indo-European language and its structure. In addition to the definition of case and its structure, this work contains most of today's grammatical elements and structures.

== Etymology ==
The English word case used in this sense comes from the Latin casus, which is derived from the verb cadere, "to fall", from the Proto-Indo-European root *ḱh₂d-. The Latin word is a calque of the Greek πτῶσις, ptôsis, lit. "falling, fall". (Note: Latin cāsus used to translate Greek πτῶσις literally "falling, fall". Aristotle applied πτῶσις to any derived, inflected, or extended form of the simple ὄνομα or ῥῆμα (i.e. the nominative of nouns, the present indicative of verbs), such as the oblique cases of nouns, the variations of adjectives due to gender and comparison, also the derived adverb (e.g. δικαίως was a πτῶσις of δίκαιος ), the other tenses and moods of the verb, including its interrogative form. The grammarians, following the Stoics, restricted πτῶσις to nouns, and included the nominative under the designation.) The sense is that all other cases are considered to have "fallen" away from the nominative. This imagery is also reflected in the word declension, from Latin declinere, "to lean", from the PIE root *ḱley-.

The equivalent to "case" in several other European languages also derives from casus, including cas in French, caso in Italian and Kasus in German. The Russian word паде́ж (padyézh) is a calque from Greek and similarly contains a root meaning "fall", and the German Fall and Czech pád simply mean "fall", and are used for both the concept of grammatical case and to refer to physical falls. The Dutch equivalent naamval translates as 'noun case', in which 'noun' has the older meaning of both 'adjective (noun)' and '(substantive) noun'. The Finnish equivalent is sija, whose main meaning is "position" or "place".

Similar to Latin, Sanskrit uses the term विभक्ति (vibhakti) which may be interpreted as the specific or distinct "bendings" or "experiences" of a word, from the verb भुज् (bhuj) and the prefix वि (vi), and names the individual cases using ordinal numbers.

== Indo-European languages ==
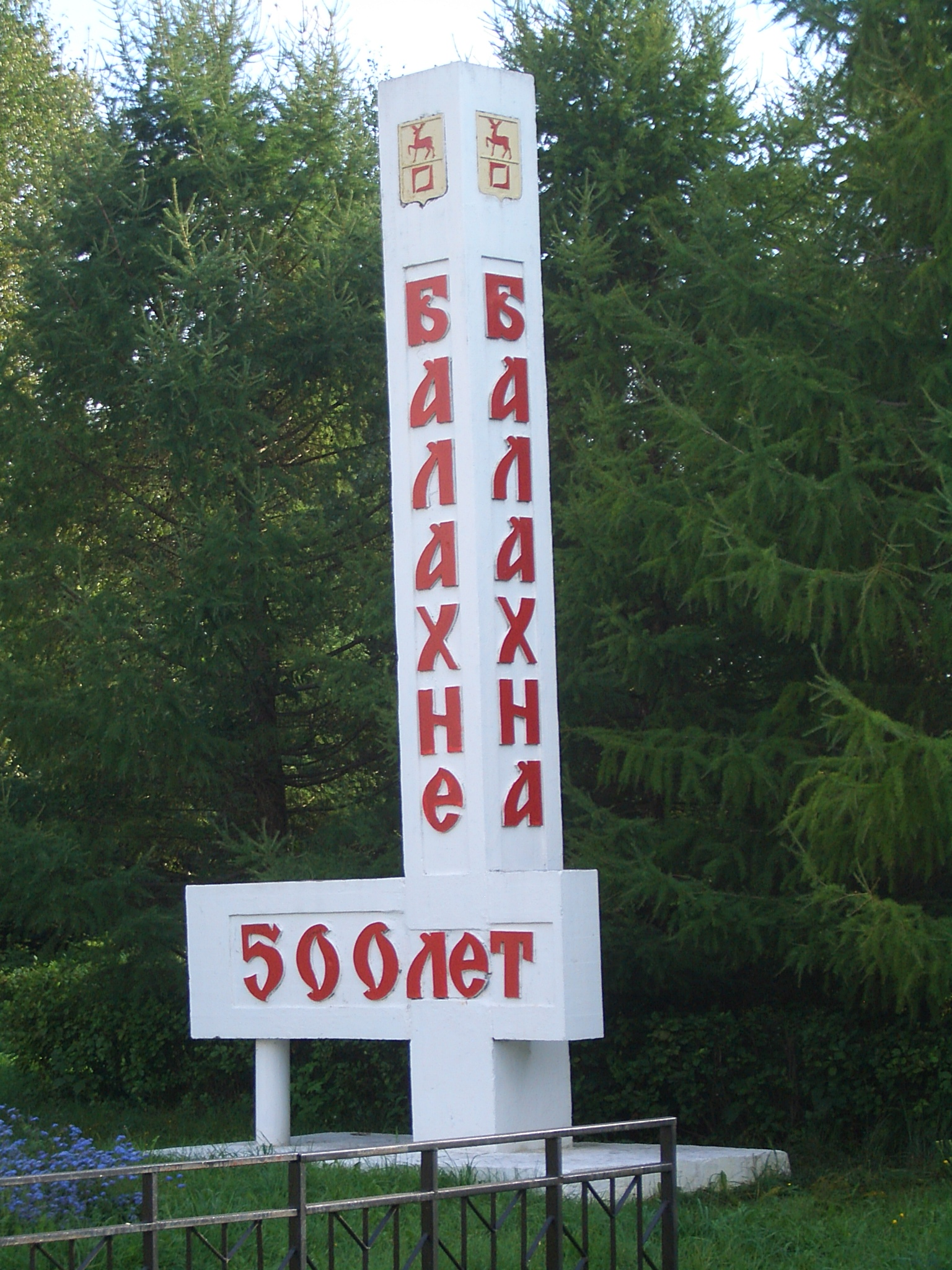
On this sign in Russian memorializing an anniversary of the city of Balakhna, the word Balakhna (Russian: Балахна) on the right is in the nominative case, whereas the word Balakhne (Russian: Балахне) is in the dative case in Balakhne 500 Let ('Balakhna is 500 years old', literally '[There is] 500 years to Balakhna') on the front of the sign. Furthermore, let is in the genitive (plural) case.

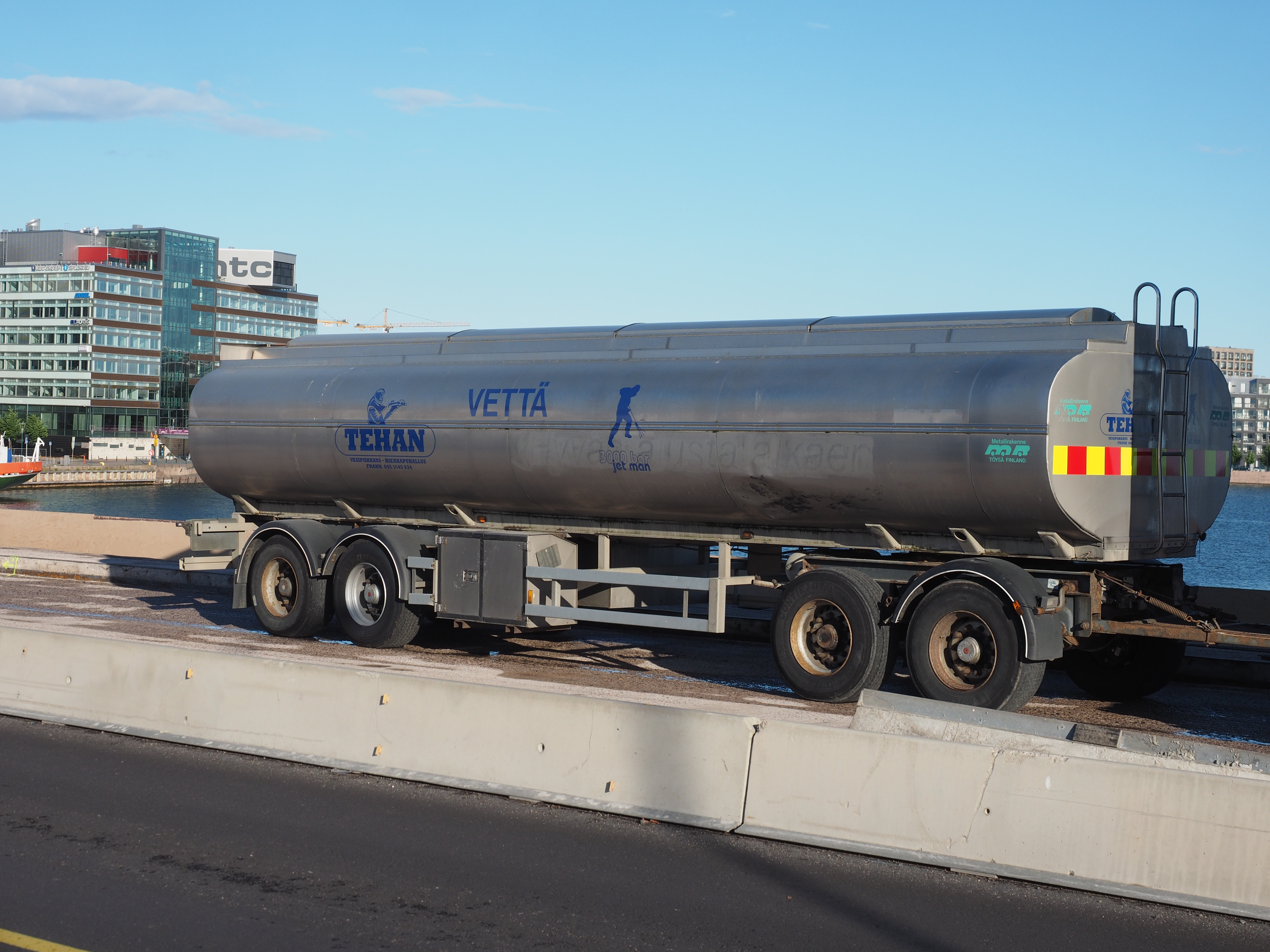
A Finnish tank truck labelled VETTÄ, the partitive singular of vesi ("water"). The partitive marks an unbounded, uncountable quantity here — "[some] water" rather than a definite whole.

Although not very prominent in modern English, cases featured much more saliently in Old English and other ancient Indo-European languages, such as Latin, Old Persian, Ancient Greek, and Sanskrit. Historically, the Indo-European languages had eight morphological cases, although modern languages typically have fewer, using prepositions and word order to convey information that had previously been conveyed using distinct noun forms. Among modern languages, cases still feature prominently in most of the Balto-Slavic languages (except Bulgarian and Macedonian), with most having six to eight cases, as well as Icelandic, German, Irish and Modern Greek, which have four. In German, cases are mostly marked on articles and adjectives, and less so on nouns. In Icelandic, articles, adjectives, personal names and nouns are all marked for case, making it the most conservative Germanic language.

The eight historical Indo-European cases are as follows, with examples either of the English case or of the English syntactic alternative to case:

Case	Indicates	Sample case words	Sample sentence	Interrogative	Notes
Nominative	Subject of a finite verb	we, John, dodo	We went to the store. John is an avid reader. The dodo is an extinct species.	Who or what?	Corresponds to English's subject pronouns.
Accusative	Direct object of a transitive verb	us, for us, the (object)	The clerk remembered us. John ate the apple at the bus stop. John waited for us at the parking lot. Obey the law.	Whom or what?	Corresponds to English's object pronouns. Together with dative, it forms modern English's oblique case.
Dative	Indirect object of a verb	us, to us, to the (object)	The clerk gave us a discount. The clerk gave a discount to us. According to the law, this is illegal.	To whom or what?	Corresponds to English's object pronouns and preposition to and for constructions before the object, both often marked by a definite article the. Together with accusative, it forms modern English's oblique case.
Ablative	Movement away from	from us	The pigeon flew from us to a steeple.	Whence? From where/whom?	
Genitive	Possessor of another noun	of (the)	John's book was on the table. The pages of the book turned yellow. The table is made out of wood.	Whose? From what or what of?	Roughly corresponds to English's possessive (possessive determiners and pronouns) and preposition of construction.
Vocative	Addressee	John, ladies and gentlemen, O Canada,	John, are you all right? Now, ladies and gentlemen, we are proud to present… O Canada, we stand on guard for thee	–	Indicates the addressee. Roughly corresponds to the formal, poetic or reverential use of "O" in English.
Locative	Location, either physical or temporal	in Japan, at the bus stop, in the future	We live in Japan. John is waiting for us at the bus stop. We will see what will happen in the future.	Where or wherein? When?	Roughly corresponds to English prepositions in, on, at, and by and other less common prepositions.
Instrumental	A means or tool utilized in/while performing an action	with a mop, by hand, through a tunnel	We wiped the floor with a mop. This letter was written by hand. The inmates escaped through a tunnel.	How? With what or using what? By what means?	Corresponds to English prepositions by, with and via as well as synonymous constructions such as using, by use of and through.

All of the above are just rough descriptions; the precise distinctions vary significantly from language to language, and as such they are often more complex. Case is based fundamentally on changes to the noun to indicate the noun's role in the sentence – one of the defining features of fusional languages. Old English was a fusional language, but Modern English does not work this way.

=== Modern English ===
Modern English has largely abandoned the inflectional case system of Proto-Indo-European in favor of analytic constructions. The personal pronouns of Modern English retain morphological case more strongly than any other word class (a remnant of the more extensive case system of Old English). For other pronouns, and all nouns, adjectives, and articles, grammatical function is indicated only by word order, by prepositions, and by the "Saxon genitive" (-'s). (Note: The status of the possessive as an affix or a clitic is the subject of debate. It differs from the noun inflection of languages such as German, in that the genitive ending may attach to the last word of the phrase. To account for this, the possessive can be analysed, for instance as a clitic construction (an "enclitic postposition") or as an inflection of the last word of a phrase ("edge inflection").)

Taken as a whole, English personal pronouns are typically said to have three morphological cases:

- The nominative case (subjective pronouns such as I, he, she, we), used for the subject of a finite verb and sometimes for the complement of a copula.
- The oblique case (object pronouns such as me, him, her, us), used for the direct or indirect object of a verb, for the object of a preposition, for an absolute disjunct, and sometimes for the complement of a copula.
- The genitive case (possessive pronouns such as my/mine, his, her/hers, our/ours), used for a grammatical possessor. This is not always considered to be a case; see English possessive § Status of the possessive as a grammatical case.

Most English personal pronouns have five forms: the nominative case form, the oblique case form, a distinct reflexive or intensive form (such as myself, ourselves) which is based upon the possessive determiner form but is coreferential to a preceding instance of nominative or oblique, and the possessive case forms, which include both a determiner form (such as my, our) and a predicatively used independent form (such as mine, ours) which is distinct (with two exceptions: the third person singular masculine he and the third person singular neuter it, which use the same form for both determiner and independent [his car, it is his]). The interrogative personal pronoun who exhibits the greatest diversity of forms within the modern English pronoun system, having definite nominative, oblique, and genitive forms (who, whom, whose) and equivalently-coordinating indefinite forms (whoever, whomever, and whosever). The pronoun "where" has a corresponding set of derived forms (whither, whence), but they're considered archaic.

Although English pronouns can have subject and object forms (he/him, she/her), nouns show only a singular/plural and a possessive/non-possessive distinction (e.g. chair, chairs, chair's, chairs'); there is no manifest difference in the form of chair between "The chair is here." (subject) and "I own the chair." (direct object), a distinction made instead by word order and context.

== Hierarchy of cases ==
Cases can be ranked in the following hierarchy, where a language that does not have a given case will tend not to have any cases to the right of the missing case:

nominative or absolutive → accusative or ergative → genitive → dative → locative or prepositional → ablative and/or instrumental → others.

This is, however, only a general tendency. Many forms of Central German, such as Colognian and Luxembourgish, have a dative case but lack a genitive. In Irish nouns, the nominative and accusative have fallen together, whereas the dative-locative, genitive, and vocative have remained separate. In many modern Indo-Aryan languages, the accusative, genitive, and dative have merged to an oblique case, but many of these languages still retain vocative, locative, and ablative cases. Old English had an instrumental case, but not a locative case.

== Case order ==
The traditional case order (nom-gen-dat-acc) was expressed for the first time in The Art of Grammar in the 2nd century BCE:

Πτώσεις ὀνομάτων εἰσὶ πέντε· ὀρθή, γενική, δοτική, αἰτιατική, κλητική.

Translation:

There are five Cases, the right [nominative], the generic [genitive], the dative, the accusative, and the vocative.

Latin grammars, such as Ars grammatica, followed the Greek tradition, but added the ablative case of Latin. Later other European languages also followed that Graeco-Roman tradition.

However, for some languages, such as Latin, due to case syncretism the order may be changed for convenience, where the accusative or the vocative cases are placed after the nominative and before the genitive. For example:

Latin
	aqua, aquae water f.		bellum, bellī war n.	
	Singular	Plural	Singular	Plural
Nominative	aqua	aquae	bellum	bella
Vocative	aqua	aquae	bellum	bella
Accusative	aquam	aquās	bellum	bella
Genitive	aquae	aquārum	bellī	bellōrum
Dative	aquae	aquīs	bellō	bellīs
Ablative	aquā	aquīs	bellō	bellīs

For similar reasons, the customary order of the four cases in Icelandic is nominative–accusative–dative–genitive, as illustrated below:

number	case	masculine	feminine	neuter	neuter
singular	nom.	hattur	borg	glas	gler
singular	acc.	hatt	borg	glas	gler
singular	dat.	hatti	borg	glasi	gleri
singular	gen.	hatts	borgar	glass	glers
plural	nom.	hattar	borgir	glös	gler
plural	acc.	hatta	borgir	glös	gler
plural	dat.	höttum	borgum	glösum	gler(j)um
plural	gen.	hatta	borga	glasa	gler(j)a

Sanskrit similarly arranges cases in the order nominative-accusative-instrumental-dative-ablative-genitive-locative-vocative. The cases are individually named as the "first," "second," "third", and so on. For example, a common grammatical construction is called the सति सप्तमी (Sati Saptami) or "The Good Seventh" because it uses the locative, which is the seventh case, in a fashion similar to the use of "Upon" in sequential English phrases. (E.g. Upon their arrival, the two were immediately accosted by creditors.)

== Case concord systems ==
In the most common case concord system, only the head-word (the noun) in a phrase is marked for case. This system appears in many Papuan languages as well as in Turkic, Mongolian, Quechua, Dravidian, Indo-Aryan, and other languages. In Basque and various Amazonian and Australian languages, only the phrase-final word (not necessarily the noun) is marked for case. In many Indo-European, Finnic, and Semitic languages, case is marked on the noun, the determiner, and usually the adjective. Other systems are less common. In some languages, there is double-marking of a word as both genitive (to indicate semantic role) and another case such as accusative (to establish concord with the head noun).

== Declension paradigms ==
Declension is the process or result of altering nouns to the correct grammatical cases. Languages with rich nominal inflection (using grammatical cases for many purposes) typically have a number of identifiable declension classes, or groups of nouns with a similar pattern of case inflection or declension. Sanskrit has six declension classes, whereas Latin is traditionally considered to have five, and Ancient Greek three. For example, Slovak has fifteen noun declension classes, five for each gender (the number may vary depending on which paradigms are counted or omitted, this mainly concerns those that modify declension of foreign words; refer to article).

In Indo-European languages, declension patterns may depend on a variety of factors, such as gender, number, phonological environment, and irregular historical factors. Pronouns sometimes have separate paradigms. In some languages, particularly Slavic languages, a case may contain different groups of endings depending on whether the word is a noun or an adjective. A single case may contain many different endings, some of which may even be derived from different roots. For example, in Polish, the genitive case has -a, -u, -ów, -i/-y, -e- for nouns, and -ego, -ej, -ich/-ych for adjectives. To a lesser extent, a noun's animacy or humanness may add another layer of complexity. For example, in Russian:

Кот ловит мышей
Kot-∅ lóvit myshéy.
cat-NOM.AN. catches mice
(The) cat catches mice.

Столб держит крышу
Stolb-∅ dérzhit krýshu.
pillar-NOM.INAN holds roof
(The) pillar holds a/the roof)

vs.

Пётр гладит кота
Pyotr gládit kot-á
Peter strokes cat-ACC.AN
Peter strokes a/the cat

and

Пётр ломает столб
Pyotr lomáyet stolb-∅
Peter breaks pillar-ACC.INAN
Peter breaks a/the pillar

== Examples ==
=== Arabic ===
An example of a Standard Arabic case inflection is given below, using the singular forms of the Arabic term for "book" كِتَاب kitāb:

- كِتَابُ kitābu (Nominative): الكِتَابُ مُفِيد al-kitābu mufīd – (the book is useful)
- كِتَابَ kitāba (Accusative): إنَّ كِتَابَ العُلُومِ كَبِير ʔinna kitāba al-ʕulūmi kabīr – (the science book is big)
- كِتَابِ kitābi (Genitive): ذَهَبْتُ بِالكِتَابِ ḏahabtu bil-kitābi – (I went with the book)

The modern Arabic colloquial dialects have abandoned the grammatical cases of Classical Arabic, and they are only used nowadays in Modern Standard Arabic. Standard Arabic is the only living Semitic language that preserved the complete Proto-Semitic grammatical cases and declension (ʾIʿrab). In some dialects of Northern and Central Saudi Arabia, one encounters the nunation in the -in form, e.g. دَرْبٍ darbin, "a road" (as in دَرْبٍ طويل darbin ṭiwīl vs. the common colloquial دَرْبْ طويل darb ṭawīl), apparently with the -i- of the former genitive, while -u < -un is preserved in some Yemenite colloquials when the noun is indeterminate (e.g. بَيْتُ baytu, "a house", but al-bayt, "the house").

=== Australian Aboriginal languages ===
Australian languages represent a diversity of case paradigms in terms of their alignment (i.e. nominative-accusative vs. ergative-absolutive) and the morpho-syntactic properties of case inflection including where/how many times across a noun phrase the case morphology will appear. For typical r-expression noun phrases, most Australian languages follow a basic ERG-ABS template with additional cases for peripheral arguments; however, many Australian languages, the function of case marking extends beyond the prototypical function of specifying the syntactic and semantic relation of an NP to a predicate. Dench & Evans (1988) use a five-part system for categorizing the functional roles of case marking in Australian languages. They are enumerated below as they appear in Senge (2015):

1. Relational: a suffix which represents syntactic or semantic roles of a noun phrase in clauses.
2. Adnominal: a suffix which relates a noun phrase to another within the one noun phrase.
3. Referential: a suffix which attaches to a noun phrase in agreement with another noun phrase which represents one of the core arguments in the clause.
4. Subordinating: a suffix which attaches to elements of a subordinate clause. Its functions are: (i) specifying temporal or logical (typically, causal and purposive) relationships between two clauses (Temporal-subordinator); (ii) indicating coreferential relationships between arguments in the two clauses (Concord-subordinator).
5. Derivational: a suffix which attaches to a bare stem before other case suffixes and create a new lexical item.

To illustrate this paradigm in action, take the case-system of Wanyjirra for whose description Senge invokes this system. Each of the case markers functions in the prototypical relational sense, but many extend into these additional functions:

	Derivational	Adnominal	Relational	Referential	Subordinator	
	Derivational	Adnominal	Relational	Referential	C-SUB*	T-SUB*
Ergative			+	+	+	
Dative		+	+		+	+
Locative			+	+		+
Allative			+			+
Purposive			+			+
Ablative			+			
Elative	+	+	+	+		+
Comitative			+			
Originative		+	+			
Proprietive	+	+	+			
Privative	+	+	+			

Wanyjirra is an example of a language in which case marking occurs on all sub-constituents of the NP; see the following example in which the demonstrative, head, and quantifier of the noun phrase all receive ergative marking:

yalu-nggu mawun-du gujarra-lu ngu=wula yunbarn-ana junba
DIST-ERG man-ERG two-ERG REAL=3.AUG.SBJ sing-PRES corroboree.ABS
Those two men are singing corroboree.

However, this is by no means always the case or even the norm for Australian languages. For many, case-affixes are considered special-clitics (i.e. phrasal-affixes, see Anderson 2005) because they have a singular, fixed position within the phrase. For Bardi, the case marker usually appears on the first phrasal constituent while the opposite is the case for Wangkatja (i.e. the case marker is attracted to the rightmost edge of the phrase). See the following examples respectively:

Boordiji-nim niiwandi aamba i-na-m-boo-na aril
fat-ERG tall man 3-TR-PST-poke-REM.PST fish
The tall fat man speared a fish.

tjitji warta purlkana-ngka nyinarra-nyi
child tree big-LOC sitting-?
'The child is sitting in the big tree.'

=== Basque ===
Basque has the following cases, with examples given in the indefinite, definite singular, definite plural, and definite close plural of the word etxe, "house", "home":

- absolutive (etxe, etxea, etxeak, etxeok: "house, the / a house, (the / some) houses, these houses"),
- ergative (etxek, etxeak, etxeek, etxeok),
- dative (etxeri, etxeari, etxeei, etxeoi),
- genitive (etxeren, etxearen, etxeen, etxeon),
- destinative (or benefactive: etxerentzat, etxearentzat, etxeentzat, etxeontzat),
- motivative (or causal: etxerengatik, etxearengatik, etxeengatik, etxeongatik),
- sociative (etxerekin, etxearekin, etxeekin, etxeokin),
- instrumental (etxez, etxeaz, etxeez, etxeoz),
- locative or inesive (etxetan, etxean, etxeetan, etxeotan),
- ablative (etxetatik, etxetik, exteetatik, etxeotatik),
- adlative (etxetara, etxera, etxeetara, etxeotara),
- directional adlative (etxetarantz, etxerantz, etxeetarantz, etxeotarantz),
- terminative adlative (etxetaraino, etxeraino, etxeetaraino, etxeotaraino),
- locative genitive (etxetako, etxeko, etxeetako, etxeotako),
- prolative (etxetzat), only in the indefinite grammatical number,
- partitive (etxerik), only in the indefinite grammatical number, and
- distributive (Bost liburu ikasleko banatu dituzte, "They have handed out five books to each student"), only in the indefinite grammatical number.

Some of them can be re-declined, even more than once, as if they were nouns (usually, from the genitive locative case), although they mainly work as noun modifiers before a noun clause:

- etxearena (that which is of the house), etxearenarekin (with the one which pertains to the house),
- neskarentzako (which is for the girl), neskarentzakoan (in the one which is for the girl),
- neskekiko (which is with the girls), neskekikoa (the one which is for the girls),
- arazoarengatiko (which is because of the problem), arazoarengatikoak (the ones which are due to the problems),
- zurezkoaz (by means of the wooden one),
- etxeetakoaz (about the one which is in the houses), etxeetakoari (to the one which is in the houses),
- etxetiko (which comes from the house), etxetikoa (the one which comes from the house), etxetikoari (to the one which comes from the house),
- etxeetarako (which goes to the houses), etxeetarakoa (the one which goes to the houses), etxeetarakoaz (about the one which goes to the houses),
- etxeranzko (which goes towards the house), etxeranzkoa (the one which goes to the house), etxeranzkoarena (the one which belongs to the one which goes to the house),
- etxerainoko (which goes up to the house), etxerainokoa (the one which goes up to the house), etxerainokoarekin (with the one which goes up to the houses)...

=== German ===
In German, grammatical case is largely preserved in the articles and adjectives, but nouns have lost many of their original endings. Below is an example of case inflection in German using the masculine definite article and one of the German words for "sailor".

- der Seemann (nominative) "the sailor" [as a subject] (e.g. Der Seemann steht da – the sailor is standing there)
- des Seemann(e)s (genitive) "the sailor's" or "[of] the sailor" (e.g. Der Name des Seemannes ist Otto – the name of the sailor is Otto)
- dem Seemann(e) (dative) "[to/for] the sailor" [as an indirect object] (e.g. Ich gab dem Seemann ein Geschenk – I gave a present to the sailor)
- den Seemann (accusative) "the sailor" [as a direct object] (e.g. Ich sah den Seemann – I saw the sailor)

An example with the feminine definite article with the German word for "woman".

- die Frau (nominative) "the woman" [as a subject] (e.g. Die Frau isst - the woman is eating)
- der Frau (genitive) "the woman's" or "[of] the woman" (e.g. Die Katze der Frau ist weiß - the cat of the woman is white)
- der Frau (dative) "[to/for] the woman" [as an indirect object] (e.g. Ich gab der Frau ein Geschenk - I gave a present to the woman)
- die Frau (accusative) "the woman" [as a direct object] (e.g. Ich sah die Frau - I saw the woman)

An example with the neuter definite article with the German word for "book".

- das Buch (nominative) "the book" [as a subject] (e.g. Das Buch ist gut - the book is good)
- des Buch(e)s (genitive) "the book's" or "[of] the book" (e.g. Die Seiten des Buchs sind grün - the pages of the book are green)
- dem Buch(e) (dative) "[to/for] the book" [as an indirect object] (e.g. Ich gab dem Buch einen Titel - I gave the book a title)
- das Buch (accusative) "the book" [as a direct object] (e.g. Ich sah das Buch - I saw the book)

Proper names for cities have two genitive nouns:

- der Hauptbahnhof Berlins (primary genitive) "the main train station of Berlin"
- der Berliner Hauptbahnhof (secondary genitive) "Berlin's main train station"

=== Hindi-Urdu ===
Hindi-Urdu (Hindustani) has three noun cases, the nominative, oblique, and vocative cases. The vocative case is now obsolete (but still used in certain regions) and the oblique case doubles as the vocative case. The pronoun cases in Hindi-Urdu are the nominative, ergative, accusative, dative, and two oblique cases. The case forms which do not exist for certain pronouns are constructed using primary postpositions (or other grammatical particles) and the oblique case (shown in parentheses in the table below).

The other cases are constructed adpositionally using the case-marking postpositions using the nouns and pronouns in their oblique cases. The oblique case is used exclusively with these 8 case-marking postpositions of Hindi-Urdu forming 10 grammatical cases, which are: ergative ने (ne), dative and accusative को (ko), instrumental and ablative से (se), genitive का (kā), inessive में (mẽ), adessive पे (pe), terminative तक (tak), semblative सा (sā).

Noun cases		Masculine		Feminine	
Noun cases		boy	tree	girl	mother
Singular	Nominative	लड़का lar̥kā	पेड़ per̥	लड़की lar̥kī	माता mātā
Singular	Oblique	लड़के lar̥ke	पेड़ per̥	लड़की lar̥kī	माता mātā
Singular	Vocative	लड़के lar̥ke	पेड़ per̥	लड़की lar̥kī	माता mātā
Plural	Nominative	लड़के lar̥ke	पेड़ per̥	लड़कियाँ lar̥kiyã	माताएँ mātaẽ
Plural	Oblique	लड़कों lar̥kõ	पेड़ों per̥õ	लड़कियों lar̥kiyõ	माताओं mātāõ
Plural	Vocative	लड़कों lar̥kõ	पेड़ों per̥õ	लड़कियों lar̥kiyõ	माताओ mātāo

Pronoun cases	1st Person		2nd Person		
Pronoun cases	Singular	Plural	Singular	Singular & Plural	
Pronoun cases	Singular	Plural	Intimate	Familiar	Formal
Nominative	मैं ma͠i	हम ham	तू tū	तुम tum	आप āp
Ergative	मैंने ma͠ine	हमने hamne	तूने tūne	तुमने tumne	आपने āpne
Accusative	मुझे mujhe	हमें hamẽ	तुझे tujhe	तुम्हें tumhẽ	(आपको) āpko
Dative	मुझे mujhe	हमें hamẽ	तुझे tujhe	तुम्हें tumhẽ	(आपको) āpko
Oblique	मुझ mujh	हम ham	तुझ tujh	तुम tum	आप āp
Oblique (emphasised)	मुझी mujhī	हमीं hamī̃	तुझी tujhī	तुम्हीं tumhī̃	(आप ही) āp hī

Pronoun cases	Demonstrative				Relative		Interrogative	
Pronoun cases	Proximal		Distal		Singular	Plural	Singular	Plural
Pronoun cases	Singular	Plural	Singular	Plural	Singular	Plural	Singular	Plural
Nominative (colloquial)	ये ye		वो vo		जो jo		कौन, क्या^{1} kaun, kyā	
Nominative (literary)	यह yah	ये ye	वह vah	वे ve	जो jo		कौन, क्या^{1} kaun, kyā	
Ergative	इसने isne	इन्होंने inhõne	उसने usne	उन्होंने unhõne	जिसने jisne	जिन्होंने jinhõne	किसने kisne	किन्होंने kinhõne
Accusative	इसे ise	इन्हें inhẽ	उसे use	उन्हें unhẽ	जिसे jise	जिन्हें jinhẽ	किसे kise	किन्हें kinhẽ
Dative	इसे ise	इन्हें inhẽ	उसे use	उन्हें unhẽ	जिसे jise	जिन्हें jinhẽ	किसे kise	किन्हें kinhẽ
Oblique	इस is	इन in	उस us	उन un	जिस jis	जिन jin	किस kis	किन kin
Oblique (emphasised)	इसी isī	इन्हीं inhī̃	उसी usī	उन्हीं unhī̃	(जिस भी) jis bhī	(जिन भी) jin bhī	किसी kisī	किन्हीं kinhī̃

^{1} कौन (kaun) is the animate interrogative pronoun and क्या (kyā) is the inanimate interrogative pronoun.
Note: Hindi lacks 3rd person personal pronouns and to compensate the demonstrative pronouns are used as 3rd person personal pronouns.

=== Latin ===
An example of a Latin case inflection is given below, using the singular forms of the Latin term for "cook", which belongs to Latin's second declension class.

- coquus (nominative) "[the] cook" [as a subject] (e.g. coquus ibī stat – the cook is standing there)
- coquī (genitive) "[the] cook's / [of the] cook" (e.g. nōmen coquī Claudius est – the cook's name is Claudius)
- coquō (dative) "[to/for the] cook" [as an indirect object] (e.g. coquō dōnum dedī – I gave a present to the cook)
- coquum (accusative) "[the] cook" [as a direct object] (e.g. coquum vīdī – I saw the cook)
- coquō (ablative) "[by/with/from/in the] cook" [in various uses not covered by the above] (e.g. sum altior coquō – I am taller than the cook: ablative of comparison)
- coque (vocative) "[you] the cook" [addressing the object] (e.g. grātiās tibi agō, coque – I thank you, cook)

For some toponyms, a seventh case, the locative, also exists, such as Mediolānī (in Mediolanum).

The Romance languages have largely abandoned or simplified the grammatical cases of Latin. Much like English, most Romance case markers survive only in pronouns.

=== Lithuanian ===
Typically in Lithuanian, only the inflection changes for the seven different grammatical cases:

- Nominative (vardininkas): šuo – Tai yra šuo – "This is a dog."
- Genitive (kilmininkas): šuns – Tomas paėmė šuns kaulą – "Tom took the dog's bone."
- Dative (naudininkas): šuniui – Jis davė kaulą kitam šuniui – "He gave the bone to another dog."
- Accusative (galininkas): šunį – Jis nuprausė šunį – "He washed the dog."
- Instrumental (įnagininkas): šunimi – Jis šunimi išgąsdino kates – He scared the cats with (using) the dog.
- Locative (vietininkas): šunyje – Susitiksime „Baltame šunyje“ – "We'll meet at the White Dog (Cafe)."
- Vocative (šauksmininkas): šunie – Jis sušuko: Ei, šunie! – "He shouted: Hey, dog!"

=== Hungarian ===
Hungarian declension is relatively simple with regular suffixes attached to the vast majority of nouns. The following table lists all of the cases used in Hungarian.

ház – house, kettő – two
Case	Meaning	Suffix	Example	Meaning of the example
Nominative case	subject	∅	ház	house (as a subject)
Accusative case	direct object	-ot/(-at)/-et/-öt/-t	házat	house (as an object)
Dative case	indirect object	-nak/-nek	háznak	to the house
Genitive case	possession	-é	házé	of the house (belonging to)
Instrumental-comitative case	with	-val/-vel (Assim.)	házzal	with the house
Causal-final case	for, for the purpose of	-ért	házért	for the house
Translative case	into (used to show transformation)	-vá/-vé (Assim.)	házzá	[turn] into a house
Terminative case	as far as, up to	-ig	házig	as far as the house
Illative case	into (location)	-ba/-be	házba	into the house
Adessive case	at	-nál/-nél	háznál	at the house
Ablative case	from (away from)	-tól/-től	háztól	(away) from the house
Elative case	from (out of)	-ból/-ből	házból	from the inside of the house
Sublative case	onto (movement towards a thing)	-ra/-re	házra	onto the house
Superessive case	on/upon (static position)	-n/-on/-en/-ön	házon	on top of the house
Delative case	from (movement away from a thing)	-ról/-röl	házról	from on top of the house, about the house
Temporal case	at (used to indicate time or moment)	-kor	kettőkor	at two (o'clock)
Sociative case	with (archaic)	-stul/-stül	házastul	with the house
Locative case	in	-ban/-ben	házban	in the house, inside the house
Types of	types or variants of a thing	-féle	kettőféle ház	two types of houses

=== Russian ===
An example of a Russian case inflection is given below (with explicit stress marks), using the singular forms of the Russian term for "sailor", which belongs to Russian's first declension class.

- моря́к (nominative) "[the] sailor" [as a subject] (e.g. Там стоит моряк: The sailor is standing there)
- морякá (genitive) "[the] sailor's / [of the] sailor" (e.g. Сын моряка — художник: The sailor's son is an artist)
- моряку́ (dative) "[to/for the] sailor" [as an indirect object] (e.g. Моряку подарили подарок: (They/Someone) gave a present to the sailor)
- морякá (accusative) "[the] sailor" [as a direct object] (e.g. Вижу моряка: (I) see the sailor)
- моряко́м (instrumental) "[with/by the] sailor" (e.g. Дружу с моряком: (I) have a friendship with the sailor)
- о/на/в моряке́ (prepositional) "[about/on/in the] sailor" (e.g. Думаю о моряке: (I) think about the sailor)

Up to ten additional cases are identified by linguists, although today all of them are either incomplete (do not apply to all nouns or do not form full word paradigm with all combinations of gender and number) or degenerate (appear identical to one of the main six cases). The most recognized additional cases are locative (в лесу́, на мосту́, в слеза́х), partitive (ча́ю, са́хару, песку́), and two forms of vocative — old (Го́споди, Бо́же, о́тче) and neo-vocative (Маш, пап, ребя́т). Sometimes, so called count-form (for some countable nouns after numerals) is considered to be a sub-case.

=== Sanskrit ===
Grammatical case was analyzed extensively in Sanskrit. The grammarian Pāṇini identified six semantic roles or kāraka, which are related to the following eight Sanskrit cases in order:

Case		Root word: वृक्ष (vṛ́kṣa) [Tree]		
Case		Singular	Dual	Plural
Kartṛ कर्तृ	Nominative	वृक्षः vṛkṣaḥ	वृक्षौ vṛkṣau	वृक्षाः / वृक्षासः¹ vṛkṣāḥ / vṛkṣāsaḥ¹
Sambodhana सम्बोधन	Vocative	वृक्ष vṛkṣa	वृक्षौ vṛkṣau	वृक्षाः / वृक्षासः¹ vṛkṣāḥ / vṛkṣāsaḥ¹
Karma कर्म	Accusative	वृक्षम् vṛkṣam	वृक्षौ vṛkṣau	वृक्षान् vṛkṣān
Karaṇa करण	Instrumental	वृक्षेण vṛkṣeṇa	वृक्षाभ्याम् vṛkṣābhyām	वृक्षैः / वृक्षेभिः¹ vṛkṣaiḥ / vṛkṣebhiḥ¹
Sampradāna सम्प्रदान	Dative	वृक्षाय vṛkṣāya	वृक्षाभ्याम् vṛkṣābhyām	वृक्षेभ्यः vṛkṣebhyaḥ
Apādāna अपादान	Ablative	वृक्षात् vṛkṣāt	वृक्षाभ्याम् vṛkṣābhyām	वृक्षेभ्यः vṛkṣebhyaḥ
Sambandha सम्बन्ध	Genitive	वृक्षस्य vṛkṣasya	वृक्षयोः vṛkṣayoḥ	वृक्षाणाम् vṛkṣāṇām
Adhikaraṇa अधिकरण	Locative	वृक्षे vṛkṣe	वृक्षयोः vṛkṣayoḥ	वृक्षेषु vṛkṣeṣu

¹ Vedic

For example, in the following sentence leaf is the agent (kartā, nominative case), tree is the source (apādāna, ablative case), and ground is the locus (adhikaraṇa, locative case). The declensions are reflected in the morphemes -āt, -am, and -au respectively.

vṛkṣ-āt parṇ-am bhūm-au patati
{from the tree} {a leaf} {on the ground} falls

However, the cases may be deployed for other than the default thematic roles. A notable example is the passive construction. In the following sentence, Devadatta is the kartā, but appears in the instrumental case, and rice, the karman, object, is in the nominative case (as subject of the verb). The declensions are reflected in the morphemes -ena and -am.

devadatt-ena odan-am pacyate
{by Devadatta} {the rice} {is cooked}

=== Tamil ===
The Tamil case system is analyzed in native and missionary grammars as consisting of a finite number of cases. The usual treatment of Tamil case (Arden 1942) is one in which there are seven cases: nominative (first case), accusative (second case), instrumental (third), dative (fourth), ablative (fifth), genitive (sixth), and locative (seventh). In traditional analyses, there is always a clear distinction made between post-positional morphemes and case endings. The vocative is sometimes given a place in the case system as an eighth case, but vocative forms do not participate in usual morphophonemic alternations and do not govern the use of any postpositions. Modern grammarians, however, argue that this eight-case classification is coarse and artificial and that Tamil usage is best understood if each suffix or combination of suffixes is seen as marking a separate case.

Case		Suffixes		Example: மன்னன் (mannan) [king]
First case	Nominative	—		மன்னன் (mannan)
Second case	Accusative	ai	ஐ	மன்னனை (mannanai)
Third case	Instrumental	al; udan, kondu	ஆல், உடன்; கொண்டு	மன்னனால் (mannanaal); மன்னனுடன் (mannanudan); மன்னனோடு (mannanOdu)
Fourth case	Dative	(u)kku; poruttu; aaga	கு; பொருட்டு; ஆக	மன்னனுக்கு (mannanukku); மன்னனின் பொருட்டு (mannanin poruttu); மன்னனுக்காக (mannanukkaaga)
Fifth case	Ablative	in; il; ilrundu	இன்; இல்; இருந்து	மன்னனின் (mannanin); மன்னனில் (mannanil); மன்னனிலிருந்து (mannanilirundu)
Sixth case	Genitive	athu; udaiya	அது; உடைய	மன்னனது (mannanadu); மன்னனுடைய (mannanudaiya)
Seventh case	Locative	il; idam; kaṇ (Old Tamil)	இல்; இடம்; கண் (Old Tamil)	வீட்டில் (vīṭṭil); மன்னனிடம் (mannanidam)
Eighth case	Vocative	e; a	ஏ; ஆ	மன்னனே (mannanE); மன்னவா(mannavaa)

=== Turkish ===
Modern Turkish has six cases (In Turkish İsmin Hâlleri).

	Nominative What? Who?	Accusative (Note: Yaşamı sevmek, gazeteyi okumak, camları silmek, ödevini yapmak, sesini duymak, kapıyı açmak, üzümü toplamak. Not: Saat yediyi beş geçiyor. Üçü çeyrek geçiyor.) What? Who?	Dative (Note: Saat dokuza on var. On ikiye çeyrek var. Kaç liraya? Kaça?) (Note: Edatlardan –e ile bağlananlar: bize göre, bize karşı, her şeye karşın, kışa doğru, o konuya dair, size ait, yağmura karşın, iyiliklerine karşılık) (Note: ben, senperson pronouns: Ben-e> bana, sen-e>sana) To whom?	Locative (Note: Kesir sayları kurar: Yüzde yirmi faiz, dörtte bir elma, yüzde yetmiş devam, binde bir olasılık, yüzde on beş indirim.) (Note: -de+ek-fill örneği: –Yarın evde misiniz? – Yok, okuldayım. – Şimdi neredesiniz? - Şu anda dersteyiz. Otur-mak-ta-dır (oturuyor), otur-mak-ta-y-dı (oturuyordu), otur-mak-ta-y-mış (oturuyormuş), otur-mak-ta-y-sa (oturuyorsa).) Where? Whom?	Ablative (Note: Some prepositions of name connects with –den: –den önce, - den sonra, -den dolayı, - den beri, -den itibaren, -den başka vb. kahvaltıdan önce, yemekten sonra, yağmurdan dolayı, öğleden beri, bügünden itibaren, Ayça’dan başka.) (Note: -den+ek-fill (ait olma bildirir): Kimlerdensiniz? Alp te bizdendir. (Bizim takımdandır.) Bulgaristan göçmenlerindenmiş. Sizin öğrencilerinizdenim.) Where from? From whom? Why?	Genitive Whose? Of what?
Singular	çiçek / (a/the) flower (nom)	çiçeği / (a/the) flower (acc)	çiçeğe / to (a/the) flower	çiçekte / in (a/the) flower	çiçekten / from (a/the) flower	çiçeğin / of (a/the) flower
Plural	çiçekler / (the) flowers (nom)	çiçekleri / (the) flowers (acc)	çiçeklere / to (the) flowers	çiçeklerde / in (the) flowers	çiçeklerden / from (the) flowers	çiçeklerin / of (the) flowers

The accusative can exist only in the noun(whether it is derived from a verb or not). For example, "Arkadaşlar bize gelmeyi düşünüyorlar." (Friends are thinking of coming to us).

The dative can exist only in the noun (whether it is derived from a verb or not). For example, "Bol bol kitap okumaya çalışıyorum." (I try to read a lot of books).

== Evolution ==
As languages evolve, case systems change. In early Ancient Greek, for example, the genitive and ablative cases of given names became combined, giving five cases, rather than the six retained in Latin. In modern Hindi, the cases have been reduced to three: a direct case (for subjects and direct objects) and oblique case, and a vocative case. In English, apart from the pronouns discussed above, case has vanished altogether except for the possessive/non-possessive dichotomy in nouns.

The evolution of the treatment of case relationships can be circular. Postpositions can become unstressed and sound like they are an unstressed syllable of a neighboring word. A postposition can thus merge into the stem of a head noun, developing various forms depending on the phonological shape of the stem. Affixes are subject to various phonological processes such as assimilation, vowel centering to the schwa, phoneme loss, and fusion, and these processes can reduce or even eliminate the distinctions between cases. Languages can then compensate for the resulting loss of function by creating postpositions, thus coming full circle.

Recent experiments in agent-based modeling have shown how case systems can emerge and evolve in a population of language users. The experiments demonstrate that language users may introduce new case markers to reduce the cognitive effort required for semantic interpretation, hence facilitating communication through language. Case markers then become generalized through analogical reasoning and reuse.

== Case in generative grammar ==
In mainstream generative grammar, grammatical cases are often divided into structural and non-structural (other terms include 'inherent', 'lexical', 'quirky', etc.). Structural case is assigned to nominal arguments in specific clausal positions, while non-structural case is generally assigned according to the nominal's thematic role or selecting lexical item. All case features can be considered uninterpretable as they exist to regulate sentence structure rather than to contribute to meaning. There is significant debate on the status and assignment of non-structural case.

Functional heads assign structural case to nominals in their c-command domain by Agree, where nominative case is assigned by finite T(ense) heads and accusative by little v heads. As case is assigned by Agree, regular constraints on Agree will apply to case assignment. Where T is not immediately dominated by a C head, it is considered defective as it does not assign case (nor does it have a full set of phi-features). Some argue that this is because T inherits its case features, as well as all other features, from the C dominating it. Similarly, Burzio's generalization states that v will only assign case if it is in a transitive construction; there is a correlation between the assignment of an agent theta role and the assignment of accusative case to a direct object.

== Linguistic typology ==
=== Morphosyntactic alignment ===
Languages are categorized into several case systems, based on their morphosyntactic alignment—how they group verb agents and patients into cases:

- Nominative–accusative (or simply accusative): The argument (subject) of an intransitive verb is in the same case as the agent (subject) of a transitive verb; this case is then called the nominative case, with the patient (direct object) of a transitive verb being in the accusative case.
- Ergative–absolutive (or simply ergative): The argument (subject) of an intransitive verb is in the same case as the patient (direct object) of a transitive verb; this case is then called the absolutive case, with the agent (subject) of a transitive verb being in the ergative case.
- Ergative–accusative (or tripartite): The argument (subject) of an intransitive verb is in its own case (the intransitive case), separate from that of the agent (subject) or patient (direct object) of a transitive verb (which is in the ergative case or accusative case, respectively).
- Active–stative (or simply active): The argument (subject) of an intransitive verb can be in one of two cases; if the argument is an agent, as in "He ate", then it is in the same case as the agent (subject) of a transitive verb (sometimes called the agentive case), and if it is a patient, as in "He tripped", then it is in the same case as the patient (direct object) of a transitive verb (sometimes called the patientive case).
- Trigger: One noun in a sentence is the topic or focus. This noun is in the trigger case, and information elsewhere in the sentence (for example a verb affix in Tagalog) specifies the role of the trigger. The trigger may be identified as the agent, patient, etc. Other nouns may be inflected for case, but the inflections are overloaded; for example, in Tagalog, the subject and object of a verb are both expressed in the genitive case when they are not in the trigger case.

The following are systems that some languages use to mark case instead of, or in addition to, declension:

- Positional: Nouns are not inflected for case; the position of a noun in the sentence expresses its case.
- Adpositional: Nouns are accompanied by words that mark case.

=== Language families ===
- With a few exceptions, most languages in the Finno-Ugric family make extensive use of cases. Finnish has 15 cases according to the traditional description (or up to 30 depending on the interpretation). However, only 12 are commonly used in speech (see Finnish noun cases and Finnish locative system). Estonian has 14 (see Estonian locative system) and Hungarian has 18, both with additional archaic cases used for some words.
- Turkic, Mongolic, and Tungusic languages also exhibit complex case systems. Since the abovementioned languages, along with Korean and Japanese, shared certain similarities, linguists proposed an Altaic family and reconstructed its case system; although the hypothesis had been largely discredited.
- The Tsez language, a Northeast Caucasian language, has 64 cases.
- Basque, a language isolate of Europe, also has a complex case system, with 17 cases multiplied by four for definiteness and number.
- The original version of John Quijada's constructed language Ithkuil has 81 noun cases, and its descendant Ilaksh and Ithkuil after the 2011 revision both have 96 noun cases.

The lemma form of words, which is the form chosen by convention as the canonical form of a word, is usually the most unmarked or basic case, which is typically the nominative, trigger, or absolutive case, whichever a language may have.

== See also ==
- Agreement (linguistics)
- Case hierarchy
- Declension
- Differential object marking
- Inflection
- List of grammatical cases
- Phi features
- Thematic relation
- Verbal case
- Voice (grammar)

== Bibliography ==
- H.R. Robbins (1967). A Short History of Linguistics (PDF). Longman. ISBN 0582523974.
