= Estonian locative system =

Aspect of Estonian linguistics

The Estonian language has six locative cases, descended from the locative cases of Proto-Finnic. They can be classified according to a three-way contrast of entering, residing in, and exiting a state, with two sets of cases: inner and outer.

System	Entering	Residing in	Exiting
Inner	-sse "into" (illative)	-s "in" (inessive)	-st "from (inside)" (elative)
Outer	-le "(on)to" (allative)	-l "on (top of) / at" (adessive)	-lt "from (at/on)" (ablative)
State	-ks "into as" (translative)	-na "as" (essive)	-nt "from being as" (exessive)

For some nouns, there are two forms of the illative: the regular suffix -sse (e.g. keelesse), added to the genitive stem, and an alternative, short form, which is either consists of a different suffix (keel > keelde), lengthening (e.g. maja > majja, [ko:l] > [ko::li]), and/or another change in the word. The always regular -sse illative ending is a newer innovation, and can sometimes have a slightly different meaning than the old "short form" illative, the latter having the concrete locative meaning (e.g.: tuppa 'into the room'), and the former being used in other structures that require the illative (mis puutub toasse 'concerning the room...').

== See also ==
- Proto-Finnic locative system
- Finnish locative system
