= Exessive case =

Grammatical case

The exessive case (abbreviated EXESS) is a grammatical case that denotes a transition away from a state. It is a rare case found in certain dialects of Baltic-Finnic languages. It completes the series of "to/in/from a state" series consisting of the translative case, the essive case and the exessive case.

The exessive case has been described in Estonian, South Estonian, Livonian, Votic, Ingrian, Ludic, Karelian, and Finnish.

== Estonian ==
In the general pattern of the loss of a final vowel when compared to Finnish, the Estonian exessive ending is -nt.

Exessive case is unproductive in contemporary Estonian. It appears in words such as kodunt 'away from home' and tagant 'from behind', or South Estonian mant 'away from the vicinity of something'. The exessive is more common in the language of Estonian folk songs.

== Finnish ==
The exessive is found only in Savo and southeastern dialects. Its ending is -nta/ntä. For example, tärähtäneentä terveeksi = "from loony to healthy", or a state change from mental illness to mental health.

There are some word forms in Finnish dialects in which the exessive appears in a locative sense. These are somewhat common, though nonstandard, for example takaanta/takanta (from behind, standard Finnish takaa), siintä (from that/it or thence, standard Finnish siitä).

== Publications ==
- Ariste, Paul. 1960. "Ekstsessiivist läänemere keeltes." In Emakeele Seltsi Aastaraamat, VI, pp. 145-161.
- Särkkä, Tauno (1969). Itämerensuomalaisten kielten eksessiivi [The exessive case of the Baltic-Finnic languages] (in Finnish). Helsinki: Suomalaisen Kirjallisuuden Seura.
