= Herman Hakulinen =

Finnish politician

Johan Herman Hakulinen (28 November 1866 – 11 November 1928) was a Finnish educationist, farmer and politician, born in Tohmajärvi. He was a member of the Diet of Finland from 1904 to 1905 and of the Parliament of Finland from 1907 to 1908, representing the Finnish Party.
