= Lauri Hakulinen =

Finnish linguist

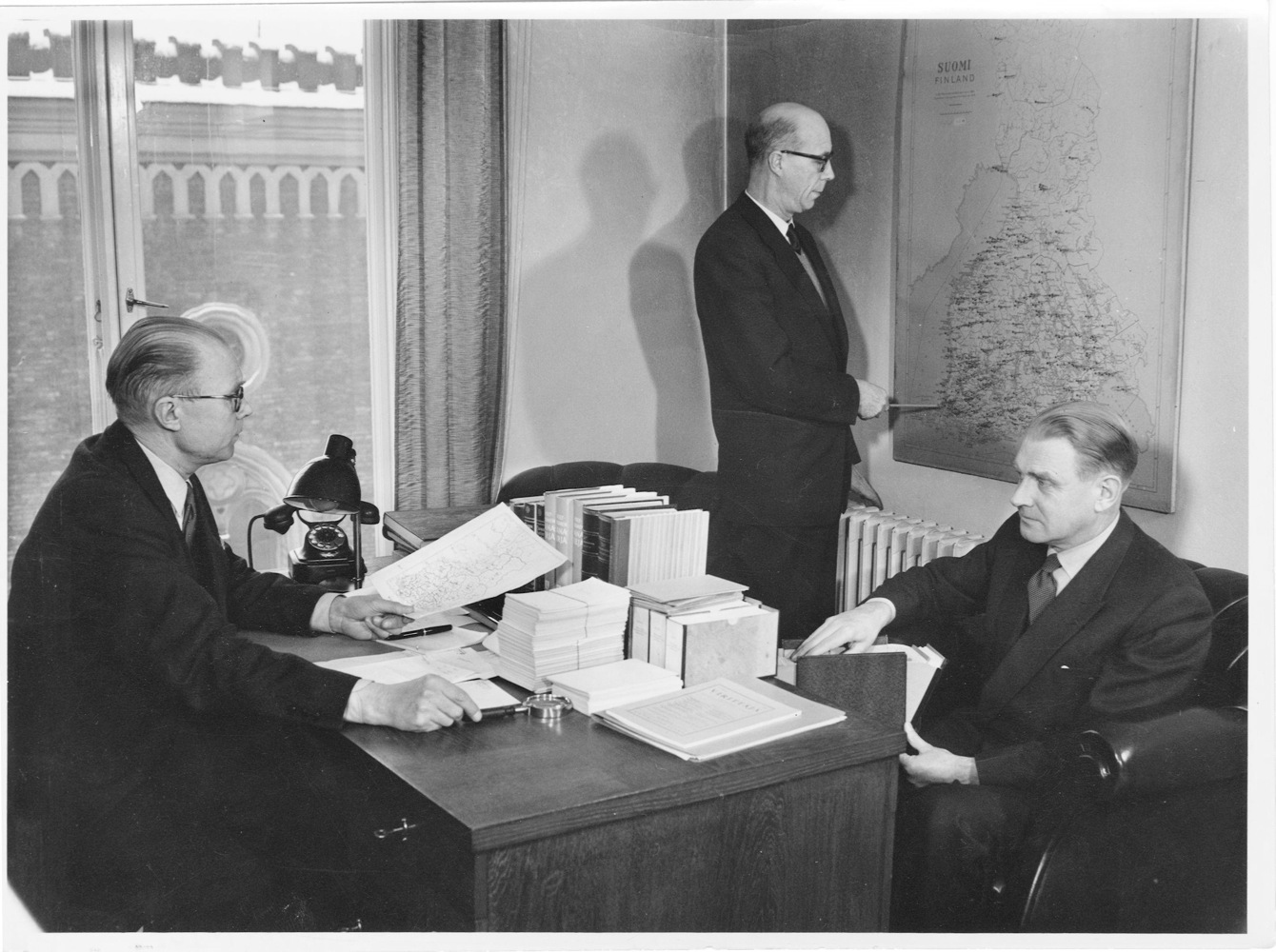
Lauri Hakulinen (to the left) with his colleagues Veikko Ruoppila and R. E. Nirvi in 1955.

Lauri Pekka Hakulinen (6 August 1899 – 2 March 1985) was a Finnish professor of linguistics at Helsinki University and the director of the Finnish Dictionary Fund (Sanakirjasäätiö). He is perhaps best known for his collection of work on the historical development and structure of the Finnish language.

Lauri Hakulinen was the father of Auli Hakulinen, a Finnish linguist.

== Works ==
- "Ei suul vallan syärä, sil puhutaan kans" (1938)
- Agricolan kieli ja viro (SKS 1942)
- Itä-Kannaksen murresanakirja (compiled with Adolf Neovius and Veikko Ruoppila; SKS 1984)
- Itä-Karjalan murreopas (with Jalo Kalima and T. E. Uotila; Otava 1942)
- Kansallisten tieteiden noususta Virossa (1942)
- Kielen näkymiä (SKS 1970)
- Kielitaitoa suomen kielen opiskelijalle ja opettajalle (SKS 1957)
- Kielivirheen suhteellisuudesta (1938)
- Kirjoituksia suomen kielestä (with Osmo Ikola and Paavo Ravila; SKS 1967)
- Kostea ja kostua (1940)
- Leo Weisgerberin kieliteoriasta (1956)
- Lisiä meteorologis-affektisten sanueiden merkityksenkehityksen tuntemiseen (1942)
- Luennot suomen kielen partikkeleista (Helsingin yliopiston suomen kielen laitos 1999)
- Lyhytkö vai pitkä ensi tavun ääntiö (1929)
- Meteorologisten sanojen merkitysoppia (1942)
- Mielenkiintoisia sanoja 3 (Sanakirjasäätiö 1930)
- Mikä on luonteenomaista suomen kielen äännerakenteelle? (1938)
- Nuoha (1939)
- Opas suomen kielen murteiden sanavarain kerääjille (SKS 1924)
- Sanakirjatyömaalta 1–2 (Sanakirjasäätiö 1936–1937)
- Sanat on kaikki sarvipäitä (1938)
- Sanat on kaikki sarvipäitä (SKS 1999)
- Sanojen sanottavaa (SKS 1958)
- Suomen kansan sananparsikirja (with R. E. Nirvi; WSOY 1948)
- Suomen kansankielen sanakirjan esitöistä (1938)
- Suomen kielen rakenne ja kehitys (1941–1946)
- Suomen sanaston käännöslainoja (SKS 1969)
- Syttyä (1939)
- The structure and development of the Finnish language (1961)
- Äidinkielemme (with Vilho Myrsky; Otava 1947)

=== Studia Finnica series ===
- Finnisch luokka 'Klasse' (1938)
- Les dictionnaires des parlers populaires et la linguistique moderne (1938)
- Über die semasiologische Entwicklung einiger meteorologisch-affektivischen Wortfamilien in den ostseefinnischen Sprachen (1933)
