= Iso suomen kielioppi =

Reference grammar of Finnish

- Front cover of Iso suomen kielioppi
- Author: Auli Hakulinen, Maria Vilkuna, Riitta Korhonen, Vesa Koivisto, Tarja-Riitta Heinonen and Irja Alho
- Language: Finnish
- Genre: Reference book
- Publisher: Finnish Literature Society
- Publication date: 2004
- Publication place: Finland
- Media type: Print (Hardcover)
- ISBN: 951-746-557-2
- OCLC: 57722711
- LC Class: PH135 .I85 2004

Iso suomen kielioppi (lit. "the large grammar of Finnish") is a reference book of Finnish grammar. It was published in 2004 by the Finnish Literature Society and to this date is the most extensive of its kind. It is a collaboration written by noted Finnish language scholars Auli Hakulinen, Maria Vilkuna, Riitta Korhonen, Vesa Koivisto, Tarja-Riitta Heinonen and Irja Alho.

The 1,698 page book differs from earlier grammars by taking a descriptive approach and describing colloquial Finnish in addition to standard literary Finnish.

The entire work is also freely available online.
