= Prolative case =

Grammatical case signifying "by way of ..." or "via ..."

In grammar, the prolative case (abbreviated prol), also called the vialis case (abbreviated via), prosecutive case (abbreviated pros), traversal case, mediative case, or translative case, is a grammatical case of a noun or pronoun that has the basic meaning of "by way of" or "via".

In Finnish, the prolative case follows an established application in a number of fossilized expressions to indicate "by (medium of transaction)". It can be used in other constructions, but then it does not sound "natural". Examples would be "postitse" ("by post"), "puhelimitse" ("by telephone"), "meritse" ("by sea"), "netitse" ("over the Internet"). A number of Finnish grammarians classify the prolative form as an adverb because it does not require agreement with adjectives like other Finnish cases. This claim is not true, however, because an adjective will agree with the prolative: "Hän hoiti asian pitkitse kirjeitse" ("He/she dealt with the matter by way of a long letter").

The prolative exists in a similar state in the Estonian language, with the suffix "-(t)si", as seen in "jalgsi" ("by foot"), and in the Karelian language, with the suffix "-čči", as seen in "rannačči" ("by the coast").

The vialis case in Eskimo–Aleut languages has a similar interpretation, used to express movement using a surface or way. For example, in the Greenlandic language umiarsuakkut 'by ship' or in Central Alaskan Yup'ik kuigkun 'by river' or ikamrakun 'by sled'.

Basque grammars frequently list the nortzat / nortako case (suffix -tzat or -tako) as "prolative" (prolatiboa). However, the meaning of this case is unrelated to the one just described above for other languages and alternatively has been called "essive / translative", as it means "for [something else], as (being) [something else]"; e.g., hiltzat eman "to give up for dead", lelotzat hartu zuten "they took him for a fool". The meaning "by way of" of the case labelled prolative in the above languages is expressed in Basque by means of the instrumental (suffix -[e]z).

This case is also called the prosecutive case in some languages. It is found under this name in Tundra Nenets, in Old Basque and, with spatial nouns, in Mongolian.

== See also ==
- Perlative case
