= Auli Hakulinen =

Finnish researcher and professor emerita (born 1941)

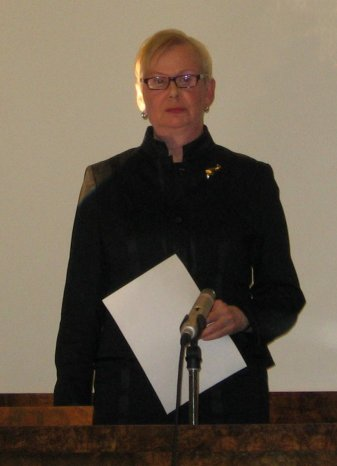
- Hakulinen at her farewell seminar in January 2007
- Born: 10 March 1941 (age 84); Helsinki
- Occupation: linguist

Auli Talvikki Hakulinen (born 10 March 1941 in Helsinki) is a Finnish researcher and professor emerita of linguistics. She worked as professor of Finnish at the University of Helsinki from 1991 to 2006. From 2001 to 2004, she was an academy professor.

== Life ==
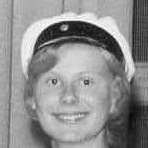
Auli Hakulinen at school

Hakulinen was born in Helsinki in 1941. She went to the Munkkiniemi Secondary School. Her father was Lauri Hakulinen, a researcher of Finnish.

In 1999 she joined the Finnish academy of science. Hakulinen was the head editor of the leading reference book on the grammar of Finnish, Iso suomen kielioppi. The main extent of her research has been in syntax and text linguistics. She had also introduced conversation analysis to Finland and has also had an interest in women's studies. Hakulinen has been a notable contribution to the development of Finnish linguistics.

== Books ==
- Auli Hakulinen; Jussi Ojanen (1993). Kielitieteen ja fonetiikan termistöä. Helsinki: Suomalaisen Kirjallisuuden Seura. ISBN 951-717-783-6.
- Auli Hakulinen; Fred Karlsson (1995). Nykysuomen lauseoppia. Helsinki: Suomalaisen Kirjallisuuden Seura. ISBN 951-717-844-1.
- Auli Hakulinen (2001). Lukemisto. Kirjoituksia kolmelta vuosikymmeneltä. Helsinki: Suomalaisen Kirjallisuuden Seura. ISBN 951-746-199-2.
- Auli Hakulinen; et al. (2004). Iso suomen kielioppi. Helsinki: Suomalaisen Kirjallisuuden Seura. ISBN 951-746-199-2.
- Auli Hakulinen; Margret Selting, eds. (2005). Syntax and Lexis in Conversation. Amsterdam/Philadelphia: John Benjamins. ISBN 978-90-272-2627-3.
