= Instrumental-comitative case =

Grammatical case

In grammar, the instrumental-comitative case combines the instrumental case and the comitative case, functioning in a similar way to the English preposition "with". It may indicate the means of the action (for example, "with a knife", "using a fork", "by tram") and the person in whose company the action is carried out (for example, "with his family"), as well as other meanings such as the temporal or the modal.

The instrumental-comitative case exists in Hungarian, Selkup, and Ubykh languages.
