= Translative case =

Grammatical case

In grammar, the translative case (abbreviated transl) is a grammatical case that indicates a change in state of a noun, with the general sense of "becoming X " or "change to X ".

In Finnish, it is the counterpart of the essive case, with the basic meaning of a change of state. It is also used for expressing "in (a language)", "considering it is a (status)" and "by (a time)". Its ending is -ksi:

- pitkä "long", venyi pitkäksi "(it) stretched long"
- englanti "English", En osaa sanoa tätä englanniksi "I can't say this in English"
- pentu "cub", Se on pennuksi iso "For a cub, it is big"
- musta aukko "black hole", (muuttui) mustaksi aukoksi "(turned into) a black hole"
- kello kuusi "(at) six o' clock", kello kuudeksi "by six o' clock"

Examples in Estonian, where the ending is -ks:

- pikk "long", venis pikaks "(it) stretched long"
- must auk "black hole", (muutus/muundus) mustaks auguks "(turned into) a black hole"
- kell kuus "(at) six o' clock", kella kuueks "by six o' clock"

In Estonian, translative can also express a temporary or random state. E.g. while a nominative construction would indicate working in a job or profession, as olen koolis õpetaja "I'm a teacher in a school", a similar sentence using translative olen koolis õpetajaks "I work as a teacher in a school" hints at it either being a temporary position, the speaker not being fully qualified, or some other factor of impermanency.

In Hungarian, the ending is -vá / -vé after a vowel; it assimilates to the final consonant otherwise:

- só "salt", Lót felesége sóvá változott "Lot's wife turned into salt"
- fia "one's son" fiává fogad "adopt as one's son"
- bolond "fool" bolonddá tett engem "He made a fool out of me."
