= Proto-Kabardian language =

Reconstructed ancestor of the Circassian languages

Proto-Kabardian
- Proto Eastern Circassian
- Reconstruction of: Circassian languages
- Reconstructed ancestor: Proto-Northwest Caucasian

Proto-Kabardian (or Proto Eastern Circassian) is the reconstructed common ancestor of the Kabardian dialects and the Besleney dialect. Together with its sister language, Proto-Adyghe, it is descended from Proto-Circassian.

== Phonology ==
=== Consonants ===
The consonant system is reconstructed with a four-way phonation contrast in stops and affricates, and a two-way contrast in fricatives.

Proto- Eastern	Besleney	Dialectal Kabardian	Modern Kabardian
b б
p п
pʼ пӀ
d д
t т
tʼ тӀ
ɡʲ гь	ɡʲ гь	ɡʲ гь	d͡ʒ дж
kʲ кь	kʲ кь	kʲ кь	t͡ʃ ч
kʲʼ кӀь	kʲʼ кӀь	kʲʼ кӀь	t͡ʃʼ чӀ (written as кӀ)
ɡʷ гу
kʷ ку
kʷʼ кӀу
q къ
q͡χ кхъ
qʷ къу
q͡χʷ кхъу
t͡s ц
t͡sʼ цӀ
d͡ʒʷ джу	v в		
d͡ʒ дж	d͡ʒ дж	ʒ ж	ʒ ж
t͡ʃ ч	t͡ʃ ч	ʃ ш	ʃ ш
t͡ʃʼ чӀ	t͡ʃʼ чӀ	ɕʼ щӀ	ɕʼ щӀ
z з
s с
Proto- Eastern	Besleney	Dialectal Kabardian	Modern Kabardian
ʑ жь
ɕ щ
ɕʼ щӀ
ʐʷ жъу	v в		
ʂʷ шъу	f ф		
ʃʷʼ шӀу	fʼ фӀ		
ʑ ж
ʃ ш
ɮ л
ɬ лъ
ɬʼ лӀ
ɣ г
x х
xʷ ху
ʁ гъ
ʁʷ гъу
χ хъ
χʷ хъу
ħ хь
m м
n н
r р
w у
j й
ʔ Ӏ
ʔʷ Ӏу

=== Evolution of Consonants ===
Proto-Kabardian possessed a distinct series of stops and affricates. This inventory included palatalized velars and postalveolar affricates.

Postalveolar affricates:

- d͡ʒ ⟨дж⟩
- t͡ʃ ⟨ч⟩
- t͡ʃʼ ⟨чӀ⟩

Palatalized velars:

- ɡʲ ⟨гь⟩
- kʲ ⟨кь⟩
- kʲʼ ⟨кӀь⟩

The evolution into Modern Standard Kabardian occurred in two distinct phases. The Besleney dialect was not affected by either Phase 1 or Phase 2, preserving the Proto-Kabardian forms. Some Kabardian dialects (like Uzunyayla) were affected by Phase 1 but not Phase 2. Standard Kabardian underwent both shifts.

==== Phase 1: Spirantization (Affricate to Fricative) ====
In Phase 1, the original Proto-Kabardian affricate postalveolar consonants underwent spirantization, becoming fricatives in Standard Kabardian. Besleney retained the affricates.

The shifts were:

- d͡ʒ ⟨дж⟩ → ʒ ⟨ж⟩
- t͡ʃ ⟨ч⟩ → ʃ ⟨ш⟩
- t͡ʃʼ ⟨чӀ⟩ → ɕʼ ⟨щӀ⟩

The following table demonstrates specific examples of this spirantization. Note that Besleney retains the affricates found in Proto-Kabardian.

Phase 1 Examples: Spirantization
Meaning	Proto-Kabardian / Besleney (Affricate)	Shift Type	Standard Kabardian (Fricative)
fox	⟨баджэ⟩ (baːd͡ʒa)	d͡ʒ → ʒ	⟨бажэ⟩ (baːʒa)
village	⟨къуаджэ⟩ (qʷaːd͡ʒa)	d͡ʒ → ʒ	⟨къуажэ⟩ (qʷaːʒa)
village	⟨джылэ⟩ (d͡ʒəɮa)	d͡ʒ → ʒ	⟨жылэ⟩ (ʒəɮa)
night	⟨джэщ⟩ (d͡ʒaɕ)	d͡ʒ → ʒ	⟨жэщ⟩ (ʒaɕ)
cow	⟨джэм⟩ (d͡ʒam)	d͡ʒ → ʒ	⟨жэм⟩ (ʒam)
spear	⟨бджы⟩ (bd͡ʒə)	d͡ʒ → ʒ	⟨бжы⟩ (bʒə)
goat	⟨бджэн⟩ (bd͡ʒan)	d͡ʒ → ʒ	⟨бжэн⟩ (bʒan)
to come out from under	⟨чӀэкӀьын⟩ (t͡ʃʼ)	t͡ʃʼ → ɕʼ	⟨щӀэкӀьын⟩ (ɕʼ)
to regret	⟨чӀэгъуэжын⟩ (t͡ʃʼ)	t͡ʃʼ → ɕʼ	⟨щӀэгъуэжын⟩ (ɕʼ)
mustache	⟨пачӀэ⟩ (t͡ʃʼ)	t͡ʃʼ → ɕʼ	⟨пащӀэ⟩ (ɕʼ)
new	⟨чӀэ⟩ (t͡ʃʼa)	t͡ʃʼ → ɕʼ	⟨щӀэ⟩ (ɕʼa)
winter	⟨чӀымахуэ⟩ (t͡ʃʼəmaːxʷa)	t͡ʃʼ → ɕʼ	⟨щӀымахуэ⟩ (ɕʼəmaːxʷa)
young-man	⟨чӀалэ⟩ (t͡ʃʼaːla)	t͡ʃʼ → ɕʼ	⟨щӀалэ⟩ (ɕʼaːla)
guest	⟨хьачӀэ⟩ (ħaːt͡ʃʼa)	t͡ʃʼ → ɕʼ	⟨хьащӀэ⟩ (ħaːɕʼa)
area	⟨чӀыпӀэ⟩ (t͡ʂʼəpʼa)	t͡ʂʼ → ɕʼ	⟨щӀыпӀэ⟩ (ɕʼəpʼa)
iron	⟨гъучӀы⟩ (ʁʷət͡ʂʼə)	t͡ʂʼ → ɕʼ	⟨гъущӀы⟩ (ʁʷəɕʼə)
to sleep	⟨джеин⟩ (d͡ʒajən)	d͡ʒ → ʒ	⟨жеин⟩ (ʒajən)
tree	⟨джыг⟩ (d͡ʒəɣ)	d͡ʒ → ʒ	⟨жыг⟩ (ʒəɣ)
to run	⟨джэн⟩ (d͡ʒan)	d͡ʒ → ʒ	⟨жэн⟩ (ʒan)
to run down	⟨еджэхын⟩ (jad͡ʒaxən)	d͡ʒ → ʒ	⟨ежэхын⟩ (jaʒaxən)
he-goat	⟨аджэ⟩ (aːd͡ʒa)	d͡ʒ → ʒ	⟨ажэ⟩ (aːʒa)
door	⟨бджэ⟩ (bd͡ʒa)	d͡ʒ → ʒ	⟨бжэ⟩ (bʒa)

==== Phase 2: Velar Palatalization ====
Later on, after the original affricates had become fricatives in Phase 1, a gap was left in the postalveolar position. In the majority of Kabardian dialects (including Standard Kabardian), the historical velar consonants shifted forward to fill this gap. Besleney and some Kabardian dialects (like Uzunyayla) did not undergo this shift and retained the velars.

The shifts were:

- ɡʲ ⟨гь⟩ → d͡ʒ ⟨дж⟩
- kʲ ⟨кь⟩ → t͡ʃ ⟨ч⟩
- kʲʼ ⟨кӀь⟩ → t͡ʃʼ ⟨чӀ⟩

The following tables demonstrate how Besleney retains the velars, while Standard Kabardian shifts them to affricates.

1. Proto-Kabardian/Besleney ɡʲ → Standard Kabardian d͡ʒ

Meaning	Besleney / Proto-Kabardian		Standard Kabardian	
Meaning	Cyrillic	IPA	Cyrillic	IPA
chicken	гьэд	ɡʲad	джэд	d͡ʒad
cat	гьэду	ɡʲadəw	джэду	d͡ʒadəw
shirt	гьанэ	ɡʲaːna	джанэ	dʒaːna
to study to read	егьэн	jaɡʲan	еджэн	jadʒan
glass	абгь	ʔaːbgʲ	абдж	ʔaːbd͡ʒ
game	гьэгу	ɡʲagʷ	джэгу	d͡ʒagʷ
bitter	дыгь	dəɡʲ	дыдж	dəd͡ʒ
sick	сымагьэ	səmaːɡʲa	сымаджэ	səmaːd͡ʒa
evil	бзагьэ	bzaːɡʲa	бзаджэ	bzaːd͡ʒa
valley	къуэлагьэ	qʷalaːɡʲa	къуэладжэ	qʷalaːd͡ʒa
noon	щэгьагъуэ	ɕaɡʲaːʁʷa	шэджагъуэ	ʃad͡ʒaːʁʷa
infidel	гьаур	ɡʲaːwər	джаур	d͡ʒaːwər
girl	хъыгьэбз	χəɡʲabz	хъыджэбз	χəd͡ʒabz

2. Proto-Kabardian/Besleney kʲ → Standard Kabardian t͡ʃ

Meaning	Besleney / Proto-Kabardian		Standard Kabardian	
Meaning	Cyrillic	IPA	Cyrillic	IPA
throat	кьий	kʲəj	чий	t͡ʃəj
spleen	кьэ	kʲa	чэ	t͡ʃa
to cough	пскьэн	pskʲan	псчэн	pst͡ʃan

3. Proto-Kabardian/Besleney kʲʼ → Standard Kabardian t͡ʃʼ

Meaning	Besleney / Proto-Kabardian		Standard Kabardian	
Meaning	Cyrillic	IPA	Cyrillic	IPA
egg	кӀьэнкӀьэ	kʲʼankʲʼa	кӀэнкӀэ	t͡ʃʼant͡ʃʼa
ceiling	кӀьафэ	kʲʼaːfa	кӀафэ	t͡ʃʼaːfa
rope	кӀьапсэ	kʲʼaːpsa	кӀапсэ	t͡ʃʼaːpsa
gun	кӀьэрахъуэ	kʲʼaraːχʷa	кӀэрахъуэ	t͡ʃʼaraːχʷa
long	кӀьыхь	kʲʼəħ	кӀыхь	t͡ʃʼəħ
to kill	укӀьын	wkʲʼən	укӀын	wt͡ʃʼən
to move away	ӀукӀьын	ʔʷəkʲʼən	ӀукӀын	ʔʷət͡ʃʼən
key	ӀункӀьыбзэ	ʔʷənkʲʼəbza	ӀункӀыбз	ʔʷənt͡ʃʼəbz
beard	жьакӀьэ	ʑaːkʲʼa	жьакӀэ	ʑaːt͡ʃʼa
poor	тхьэмыщкӀь	tħaməɕkʲʼ	тхьэмыщкӀэ	tħaməɕt͡ʃʼa
to be ashamed	укӀьытэн	wəkʲʼətan	укӀытэн	wət͡ʃʼətan
short	кӀьакуэ	kʲʼaːkʷa	кӀагуэ	t͡ʃʼaːɡʷa
tail	кӀьэ	kʲʼa	кӀэ	t͡ʃʼa

==== Comparison of Phases ====
The following table shows how words like "new" (affected by Phase 1) and "tail" (affected by Phase 2) are distinct in dialects. In Besleney (No phases), they remain t͡ʃʼ and kʲʼ. In Standard Kabardian (Both phases), they became ɕʼ and t͡ʃʼ.

Word	Proto Kabardian	Besleney (No Shift)	Other Kabardian dialects (Phase 1 only)	Modern Standard Kabardian (Phase 1 & 2)
tail	kʲʼa ⟨кӀьэ⟩	kʲʼa ⟨кӀьэ⟩	kʲʼa ⟨кӀьэ⟩	t͡ʃʼa ⟨кӀэ⟩
new	t͡ʃʼa ⟨чӀэ⟩	t͡ʃʼa ⟨чӀэ⟩	ʃʼa ⟨щӀэ⟩	ʃʼa ⟨щӀэ⟩
winter	t͡ʃʼəmaːxʷa ⟨чӀымахуэ⟩	t͡ʃʼəmaːxʷa ⟨чӀымахуэ⟩	ʃʼəmaːxʷa ⟨щӀымахуэ⟩	ʃʼəmaːxʷa ⟨щӀымахуэ⟩
mustache	paːt͡ʃʼa ⟨пачӀэ⟩	paːt͡ʃʼa ⟨пачӀэ⟩	paːʃʼa ⟨пащӀэ⟩	paːʃʼa ⟨пащӀэ⟩

== Grammar ==
=== Disappearance of the Absolutive Third Person Plural ===
In Circassian, there are two ways to mark the third person plural on the verb, depending on the role of the noun (Ergative vs. Absolutive):

- Absolutive Plural: Indicated by the suffix
  x ⟨-х⟩. This marks the plural subject of intransitive verbs or the plural object of transitive verbs.
- Ergative Plural: Indicated by the prefix ja- ⟨я-⟩ (or a- in some contexts). This marks the plural subject of transitive verbs.
- абы ар илъэгъуащ "(s)he saw it" (Singular Subject, Singular Object)
- абы ахэр илъэгъуахэщ "(s)he saw them" (Singular Subject, Plural Object - marked by suffix -хэ)
- абыхэм ар ялъэгъуащ "they saw it" (Plural Subject - marked by prefix я-, Singular Object)
- абыхэм ахэр ялъэгъуахэщ "they saw them" (Plural Subject and Plural Object)

In Modern Standard Kabardian, the Absolutive third-person plural suffix (

x / ⟨-х⟩) has disappeared. As a result, the verb form for a plural absolutive often resembles the singular form, even though the pronoun remains plural (ахэр).

English		Proto-Kabardian		Other Kabardian dialects		Modern Standard Kabardian	
Singular	Plural	Singular	Plural	Singular	Plural	Singular	Plural
Intransitive (Subject is Plural)
(s)he went	they went	ар кӀуа	ахэр кӀуах	ар кӀуас	ахэр кӀуахэс	ар кӀуащ	ахэр кӀуащ
(s)he read	they read	ар егьа	ахэр егьах	ар егьас	ахэр егьахэс	ар еджащ	ахэр еджащ
(s)he is going	they are going	ар макӀуэ	ахэр макӀуэх	ар макӀуэ	ахэр макӀуэх	ар макӀуэ	ахэр макӀуэ
(s)he says	they say	жеӀэ	жеӀэх	жеӀэ	жеӀэх	жеӀэ	жеӀэ
Transitive (Object is Plural)
(s)he saw it	(s)he saw them	абы ар илъэгъуа	абы ахэр илъэгъуах	абы ар илъэгъуас	абы ахэр илъэгъуасэх	абы ар илъэгъуащ	абы ахэр илъэгъуащ
(s)he killed it	(s)he killed them	абы ар иукӀа	абы ахэр иукӀах	абы ар иукӀас	абы ахэр иукӀахэс	абы ар иукӀащ	абы ахэр иукӀащ

=== Disappearance of the Present Tense -r Suffix ===
In Modern Kabardian, the suffix -r ⟨-р⟩, which typically marks the dynamic present tense in other Circassian dialects, has disappeared in specific contexts:

1. **Negative Present Tense:** The suffix is dropped before the negative marker -q'əm.
2. **Imperfect Tense:** The suffix is dropped before the past tense marker -t.

English	Proto-Kabardian (Retains -r-)	Modern Standard Kabardian (Drops -r-)
(s)he does not read it	ар еджэркъым	ар еджэкъым
(s)he does not see it	абы илъэгъуэркъым	абы илъэгъуэкъым
(s)he used to smoke	ар ефэрт	ар ефэт
(s)he used to go	ар кӀуэрт	ар кӀуэт
