= List of Cyrillic multigraphs =

The following multigraphs are used in the Cyrillic script. The palatalized consonants of Russian and other languages written as C-⟨ь⟩ are mostly predictable and therefore not included here unless they are irregular. Likewise, in the languages of the Caucasus, there are numerous other predictable multigraphs that are not included. These include doubled letters (or whole digraphs) that indicate 'tense' ('strong') consonants and long vowels; sequences with ⟨в⟩, ⟨у⟩, ⟨ә⟩ for labialized consonants; and sequences with ⟨Ӏ⟩ or ⟨ъ⟩ for ejective consonants or pharyngealized consonants and vowels. Tatar also has discontinuous digraphs.

== А ==
⟨аа⟩:

- Archi: [aː]

⟨ааӀ⟩:

- Archi: [aːˤ]

⟨ан⟩:

- Dungan: [æ̃]

⟨аь⟩:

- Chechen: [æ]
- Ingush: [æ]
- Tabasaran: [æ]

⟨аӀ⟩:

- Archi: [aˤ]
- Tsakhur: [aˤ]

== В ==
⟨вь⟩:

- Shughni: [w]

== Г ==
⟨гв⟩:

- Abaza: [ɡʷ]
- Archi: [gʷ]
- Lezgian: [gʷ]

⟨гг⟩:

- Tabasaran: [ɣ]

⟨гу⟩:

- Adyghe: [ɡʷ]
- Kabardian: [ɡʷ]
- Ossetian: [ɡʷ]
- Also found in several other languages where ⟨у⟩ is used for labialization (though this is a predictable effect of assimilation, and therefore does not result in a true digraph).

⟨гў⟩:

- Aleut language (Bering dialect): [w]

⟨гъ⟩:

- Abaza: [ʁ]
- Adyghe: [ʁ]
- Aghul: [ʁ]
- Archi: [ʁ]
- Avar: [ʁ]
- Bezhta: [ʁ]
- Crimean Tatar: [ɣ]
- Dargwa: [ɣ]
- Kabardian: [ʁ]
- Karachay-Balkar: [ʁ]
- Kumyk: [ʁ]
- Lezgian: [ʁ]
- Ossetian: [ʁ]
- Tabasaran: [ʕ]
- Tatar: word-final [ʁ]

⟨гъв⟩:

- Abaza: [ʁʷ]
- Archi: [ʁʷ]
- Lezgian: [ʁʷ]

⟨гъу⟩:

- Adyghe: [ʁʷ]
- Kabardian: [ʁʷ]
- Ossetian: [ʁʷ]

⟨гъь⟩:

- Abaza: [ʁʲ]

⟨гъӀ⟩:

- Archi: [ʁˤ]

⟨гъӀв⟩:

- Archi: [ʁˤʷ]

⟨гь⟩:

- Abaza: [ɡʲ]
- Abkhaz: [ɡʲ]
- Aghul: [h]
- Archi: [h]
- Avar: [ɦ]
- Bezhta: [h]
- Dargwa: [h]
- Kumyk: [h]
- Lezgian: [h]
- Shughni: [ɣ]
- Tabasaran: [h]

⟨гә⟩:

- Abkhaz: [ɡʷ]

⟨гӀ⟩:

- Abaza: [ʕ]
- Aghul: [ʕ]
- Archi: [ʕ]
- Avar: [ʕ]
- Chechen: [ɣ]
- Dargwa: [ʡ]
- Ingush: [ʁ]

⟨гӀв⟩:

- Abaza: [ʕʷ]

== Ӷ ==
⟨ӷь⟩:

- Abkhaz: [ʁʲ]

⟨ӷә⟩:

- Abkhaz: [ʁʷ]

== Д ==
⟨дж⟩

- Abaza: [d͡ʒ]
- Adyghe: [d͡ʒ]
- Aghul: [d͡z]
- Belarusian: [d͡ʐ]
- Bulgarian: [d͡ʒ]
- Crimean Tatar: [d͡ʒ]
- Dargwa: [d͡ʒ]
- Kabardian: [d͡ʒ]
- Karachay-Balkar: [d͡ʒ] (Karachay); [d͡z] (Balkar)
- Komi: [d͡ʒ]
- Lezgian: [d͡ʒ]
- Ossetian: [d͡ʒ]
- Russian: [d͡ʐ]
- Tabasaran: [d͡ʒ]
- Ukrainian: [d͡ʒ]

⟨джв⟩

- Abaza: [d͡ʒʷ]

⟨джь⟩

- Abaza: [d͡ʑ]

⟨дз⟩

- Abaza: [d͡z]
- Adyghe: [d͡z]
- Belarusian: [d͡z]
- Bulgarian: [d͡z]
- Dargwa: [d͡z]
- Kabardian: [d͡z]
- Komi: [d͡ʑ]
- Lezgian: [d͡z]
- Ossetian: [d͡z]
- Russian: [d͡z]
- Shughni: [d͡z]
- Tabasaran: [d͡z]
- Ukrainian: [d͡z]

⟨дзу⟩:

- Adyghe: [d͡zʷ]

⟨дч⟩:

- Russian: [t͡ɕ] (though this is a predictable effect of assimilation, and therefore not a true digraph)

⟨дь⟩:

- Yakut: [d͡ʑ]

⟨дә⟩:

- Abkhaz: [dʷ]

== Е ==
⟨ее⟩

- Archi: [eː]

⟨ееӀ⟩

- Archi: [eːˤ]

⟨еӀ⟩

- Archi: [eˤ]

== Ё ==
⟨ён⟩:

- Dungan: [jɔ̃]

⟨ёь⟩:

- Chechen: [jø]

== Ж ==
⟨жв⟩

- Abaza: [ʒʷ]
- Archi: [ʒʷ]
- Tabasaran: [ʒʷ]

⟨жд⟩:

- Russian: usually not a digraph, and pronounced [ʐd] (palatalized to [ʐdʲ] before ⟨ь⟩ and palatalizing vowels). However, in the word дождь ("rain") and its derivatives, the conservative Moscow pronunciation uses the sound [ʑː] (devoiced to [ɕː] in the nominative singular of дождь). The unpalatalized pronunciation [ʐː] in these words (unlike words with ⟨жж⟩ or ⟨зж⟩) is uncommon and considered nonstandard.

⟨жж⟩:

- Russian: usually not a digraph, and pronounced [ʐː]. However, the conservative Moscow pronunciation uses the sound [ʑː] (though this is becoming increasingly outdated).

⟨жч⟩:

- Russian: [ɕː] (though this is a predictable effect of assimilation, and therefore not a true digraph)

⟨жъ⟩:

- Adyghe: [ʐ]

⟨жъу⟩:

- Adyghe: [ʒʷ]

⟨жь⟩:

- Abaza: [ʑ]
- Abkhaz: [ʒ]
- Adyghe: [ʑ]
- Kabardian: [ʑ]

⟨жә⟩:

- Abkhaz: [ʒʷ]

== З ==
⟨зв⟩ :

- Archi: [zʷ]
- Lezgian: [zʷ]

⟨зж⟩

- Russian: [ʐː] (regular) or [ʑː] (conservative Moscow pronunciation) (though this is a predictable effect of assimilation, and therefore not a true digraph)

⟨зч⟩:

- Russian: [ɕː] (though this is a predictable effect of assimilation, and therefore not a true digraph)

== Ӡ ==
⟨ӡә⟩:

- Abkhaz: [d͡ʑʷ]

== И ==
⟨ии⟩ :

- Archi: [iː]

⟨ииӀ⟩ :

- Archi: [iːˤ]

⟨ий⟩:

- Chechen: [iː]
- Mongolian: [iː]

⟨иӀ⟩ :

- Archi: [iˤ]

== Й ==
⟨йх⟩:

- Moksha: [ç]

== К ==
⟨кв⟩:

- Abaza: [kʷ]
- Archi: [kʷʰ]
- Lezgian: [kʷ] or [kʷʰ]
- Khanty: [kʷ]

⟨кк⟩:

- Aghul: [kː]
- Archi: [kː]
- Avar: [kː]
- Chechen: [kː]
- Tabasaran: [kː]

⟨ккв⟩:

- Archi: [kːʷ]

⟨ккх⟩:

- Chechen: [qː]

⟨ккъ⟩:

- Archi: [qːʼ]

⟨ккъӀ⟩:

- Archi: [qːˤʼ]

⟨ккъӀв⟩:

- Archi: [qːˤʷʼ]

⟨ку⟩:

- Adyghe: [kʷ]
- Kabardian: [kʷ]
- Ossetian: [kʷ] or [kʷʰ]
- Also found in several other languages where ⟨у⟩ is used for labialization (though this is a predictable effect of assimilation, and therefore does not result in a true digraph).

⟨кх⟩:

- Chechen [q]
- Ingush [q]

Trigraph Кхъ

⟨кхъ⟩

- Kabardian: [q͡χ]

⟨кхъу⟩

- Kabardian: [q͡χʷ]

⟨къ⟩:

- Abaza: [qʼ]
- Adyghe: [q]
- Aghul: [qː]
- Archi: [qʼ]
- Avar: [q͡χːʼ]
- Chechen: [qʼ]
- Crimean Tatar: [q]
- Dargwa: [ɢ]
- Ingush: [qʼ]
- Kabardian: [q]
- Karachay-Balkar: [q]
- Kumyk: [ɢ] or [q]
- Lezgian: [q]
- Ossetian: [kʼ]
- Tabasaran: [qːʰ]
- Tatar: [q]

⟨къв⟩:

- Abaza: [qʷʼ]
- Archi: [qʷʼ]
- Lezgian: [qʷ]

⟨къу⟩:

- Adyghe: [qʷ]
- Kabardian: [qʷ]
- Ossetian: [kʼʷ]

⟨къь⟩:

- Abaza: [qʲʼ]

⟨къӀ⟩:

- Archi: [qˤʼ]

⟨къӀв⟩:

- Archi: [qˤʷʼ]

⟨кь⟩:

- Abaza: [kʲ]
- Abkhaz: [kʲʼ]
- Aghul: [qʼ]
- Archi: [k͡ʟ̝̊ʼ] or [ʟ̝]
- Avar: [t͡ɬːʼ]
- Dargwa: [qʼ]
- Lezgian: [qʼ]
- Tabasaran: [qʼ]

⟨кьв⟩:

- Archi: [k͡ʟ̝̊ʷʼ]
- Lezgian: [qʷʼ]

⟨кә⟩:

- Abkhaz: [kʼʷ]

⟨кӀ⟩:

- Abaza: [kʼ]
- Adyghe: [kʼ] or [t͡ʃʼ]
- Aghul: [kʼ]
- Archi: [kʼ]
- Avar: [kʼ]
- Chechen: [kʼ]
- Dargwa: [kʼ]
- Ingush [kʼ] or [kʲʼ]
- Kabardian: [t͡ʃʼ] or [kʲʼ]
- Lezgian: [kʼ]
- Tabasaran: [kʼ]

⟨кӀв⟩:

- Abaza: [kʷʼ]
- Archi: [kʷʼ]
- Lezgian: [kʷʼ]

⟨кӀкӀ⟩:

- Avar: [kːʼ]

⟨кӀу⟩:

- Adyghe: [kʷʼ]
- Kabardian: [kʷʼ]

⟨кӀь⟩:

- Abaza: [kʲʼ]

⟨кʼ⟩:

- Itelmen: [kʼ]
- Nivkh: [kʰ]

== Қ ==
⟨қь⟩:

- Abkhaz: [kʰʲ]

⟨қә⟩:

- Abkhaz: [kʷʰ]

== Ҟ ==
⟨ҟь⟩:

- Abkhaz: [qʲʼ]

⟨ҟә⟩:

- Abkhaz: [qʼʷ]

== Ӄ ==
⟨ӄʼ⟩:

- Itelmen: [qʼ]
- Nivkh: [qʰ]

== Л ==
⟨ллъ⟩:

- Archi: [ʟ̝̊ː]

⟨ллъв⟩:

- Archi: [ʟ̝̊ːʷ]

⟨лх⟩:

- Moksha: [l̥]
- Mongolian: [ɬʰ]

⟨лъ⟩:

- Adyghe: [ɬ]
- Archi: [ʟ̝̊]
- Avar: [ɬ]
- Kabardian: [ɬ]

⟨лъв⟩:

- Archi: [ʟ̝̊ʷ]

⟨лълъ⟩:

- Avar: [ɬː]

⟨ль⟩:

- Abaza: [ɮ]

⟨лӀ⟩ :

- Abaza: [ɬʼ]
- Adyghe: [ɬʼ]
- Archi: [k͡ʟ̝̊]
- Avar: [t͡ɬː]
- Kabardian: [ɬʼ]

⟨лӀв⟩ :

- Archi: [k͡ʟ̝̊ʷ]

== Н ==
⟨нг⟩:

- Karachay-Balkar: [ŋ]
- Kumyk: [ɴ] or [ŋ]
- Uzbek: [ŋ]

⟨нъ⟩:

- Crimean Tatar: [ŋ]

⟨нь⟩:

- Yakut: [ɲ]
- In the cyrillization of Chinese it is used for a word-final [n], equivalent to pinyin ⟨n⟩.

== Ң ==
⟨ңв⟩:

- Khanty: [ŋʷ]

== О ==
⟨ов⟩:

- Chechen: [ɔʊ]
- Ingush: [ow]

⟨ое⟩:

- Selkup: [æ]

⟨он⟩:

- Dungan [aŋ]

⟨оо⟩ :

- Archi: [oː]
- Shughni: [oː]

⟨ооӀ⟩ :

- Archi: [oːˤ]

⟨оь⟩:

- Chechen: [ø]
- Kumyk: [ø]
- Nogai: [ø]

⟨оӀ⟩ :

- Archi: [oˤ]

== П ==
⟨пп⟩

- Aghul: [pː]
- Archi: [pː]
- Chechen [pː]
- Tabasaran: [pː]

⟨пъ⟩:

- Ossetian: [pʼ]

⟨пӀ⟩ :

- Abaza: [pʼ]
- Adyghe: [pʼ]
- Aghul: [pʼ]
- Archi: [pʼ]
- Chechen: [pʼ]
- Dargwa: [pʼ]
- Ingush [pʼ]
- Kabardian: [pʼ]
- Lezgian: [pʼ]
- Tabasaran: [pʼ]

⟨пӀу⟩ :

- Adyghe: [pʷʼ]

⟨пʼ⟩:

- Itelmen: [pʼ]
- Nivkh: [pʰ]

== Р ==
⟨рх⟩:

- Moksha: [r̥]

⟨рхӀ⟩:

- Chechen: [r̥]
- Ingush [r̥]

== С ==
⟨св⟩:

- Archi: [sʷ]
- Lezgian: [sʷ]

⟨сж⟩:

- Russian: [ʐː] (though this is a predictable effect of assimilation, and therefore not a true digraph)

⟨сс⟩:

- Aghul: [sː]
- Archi: [sː]
- Avar: [sː]
- Chechen: [sː]

⟨сч⟩:

- Russian: [ɕː] (though this is a predictable effect of assimilation, and therefore not a true digraph)

⟨сщ⟩:

- Russian: [ɕː] (though this is a predictable effect of assimilation, and therefore not a true digraph)

== Т ==
⟨тв⟩ :

- Archi: [tʷʰ]
- Lezgian: [tʷ] or [tʷʰ]

⟨тл⟩ :

- Abaza: [ɬ]

⟨тт⟩:

- Aghul: [tː]
- Archi: [tː]
- Chechen: [tː]
- Tabasaran: [tː]

⟨тч⟩:

- Russian: [t͡ɕ] (though this is a predictable effect of assimilation, and therefore not a true digraph)

⟨тш⟩:

- Abaza: [t͡ʃ]
- Komi: [t͡ʃ]

⟨тщ⟩:

- Russian: [tɕː] (though this is a predictable effect of assimilation, and therefore not a true digraph)

⟨тъ⟩:

- Ossetian: [tʼ]

⟨тә⟩:

- Abkhaz: [tʼʷ]

⟨тӀ⟩:

- Abaza: [tʼ]
- Adyghe: [tʼ]
- Aghul: [tʼ]
- Archi: [t’]
- Avar: [tʼ]
- Chechen: [tʼ]
- Dargwa: [tʼ]
- Ingush [tʼ]
- Kabardian: [tʼ]
- Lezgian: [tʼ]
- Tabasaran: [tʼ]

⟨тӀв⟩ :

- Lezgian: [tʷʼ]

⟨тӀу⟩:

- Adyghe: [tʷʼ]

⟨тʼ⟩:

- Itelmen: [tʼ]
- Nivkh: [tʰ]

== Ҭ ==
⟨ҭә⟩:

- Abkhaz: [tʷʰ]

== У ==
⟨ув⟩:

- Chechen: [uː]
- Ingush: [uw]

⟨уо⟩:

- Shughni: [ɵ]

⟨уу⟩ :

- Archi: [uː]
- Shughni: [uː]

⟨ууӀ⟩ :

- Archi: [uːˤ]

⟨уь⟩:

- Aghul: [y]
- Chechen: [y]
- Kumyk: [y]
- Lezgian: [y]
- Nogai: [y]
- Tabasaran: [y]

⟨уьй⟩:

- Chechen: [yː]

⟨уӀ⟩ :

- Archi: [uˤ]

== Ү ==
⟨үй⟩:

- Turkmen: (until 1993, in that year the Turkmen alphabet became Latin) [yː]

== Ф ==
⟨фф⟩:

- Aghul: [fː]

⟨фӀ⟩:

- Abaza: [fʼ]
- Kabardian: [fʼ]

== Х ==
⟨хв⟩:

- Abaza: [χʷ]
- Archi: [χʷ]
- Lezgian: [χʷ]
- Khanty: [χʷ] or [xv]

⟨ху⟩:

- Kabardian: [xʷ]
- Ossetian: [χʷ]

⟨хх⟩:

- Aghul: [q͡χː]
- Archi: [χː]
- Avar: [χː]

⟨ххв⟩:

- Archi: [χːʷ]

⟨ххьӀ⟩:

- Archi: [χːˤ]

⟨ххьӀв⟩:

- Archi: [χːˤʷ]

⟨хъ⟩:

- Abaza: [q]
- Adyghe: [χ]
- Aghul: [qʰ]
- Archi: [qʰ]
- Avar: [q͡χː]
- Dargwa: [q]
- Kabardian: [χ]
- Lezgian: [qʰ]
- Ossetian: [q]
- Tabasaran: [qʰ]

⟨хъв⟩:

- Abaza: [qʷ]
- Archi: [qʷʰ]
- Lezgian: [qʷʰ]

⟨хъу⟩:

- Adyghe: [χʷ]
- Kabardian: [χʷ]
- Ossetian: [qʷ]

⟨хъӀ⟩:

- Archi: [qˤʰ]

⟨хъӀв⟩:

- Archi: [qˤʷʰ]

⟨хь⟩:

- Abaza: [χʲ]
- Abkhaz: [χʲ]
- Adyghe: [ħ]
- Aghul: [x]
- Avar: [x]
- Chechen: [ʜ]
- Dargwa: [ç]
- Ingush: [ʜ]
- Kabardian: [ħ]
- Lezgian: [x]
- Tabasaran: [x]

⟨хьв⟩:

- Lezgian: [xʷ]

⟨хьхь⟩:

- Aghul: [xː]
- Avar: [xː]

⟨хьӀ⟩:

- Archi: [χˤ]

⟨хьӀв⟩:

- Archi: [χˤʷ]

⟨хә⟩:

- Abkhaz: [χʷ]

⟨хӀ⟩:

- Abaza: [ħ]
- Aghul: [ħ]
- Archi: [ʜ]
- Avar: [ʜ]
- Chechen: [h]
- Dargwa: [ʁ]
- Ingush [h]

⟨хӀв⟩:

- Abaza: [ħʷ]

== Ҳ ==
⟨ҳә⟩:

- Abkhaz: [ħʷ]

== Ц ==
⟨цв⟩ :

- Archi: [t͡sʷ]
- Lezgian: [t͡sʷ] or [t͡sʷʰ]

⟨цз⟩:

- In the cyrillization of Chinese it is used for [t͡s] and [t͡ɕ], equivalent to pinyin ⟨z⟩ and, before an iotated vowel, ⟨j⟩.

⟨цу⟩:

- Adyghe: [t͡sʷ]

⟨цц⟩:

- Aghul: [t͡sːʰ]
- Avar: [t͡sː]
- Tabasaran: [tsːʰ]

⟨ццӀ⟩:

- Archi: [t͡sːʼ]

⟨цъ⟩:

- Ossetian: [t͡sʼ]

⟨цә⟩:

- Abkhaz: [t͡ɕʷ]

⟨цӀ⟩:

- Abaza: [t͡sʼ]
- Aghul: [t͡sʼ]
- Archi: [t͡sʼ]
- Avar: [t͡sʼ]
- Chechen: [t͡sʼ]
- Dargwa: [t͡sʼ]
- Ingush [t͡sʼ]
- Kabardian: [t͡sʼ]
- Lezgian: [t͡sʼ]
- Tabasaran: [t͡sʼ]

⟨цӀв⟩ :

- Lezgian: [t͡sʷʼ]

⟨цӀцӀ⟩:

- Avar: [t͡sːʼ]

== Ҵ ==
⟨ҵә⟩:

- Abkhaz: [t͡ɕʷʼ]

== Ч ==
⟨чв⟩:

- Abaza: [t͡ʃʷ]
- Archi: [t͡ʃʷ]
- Tabasaran: [t͡ʃʷʰ]

⟨чж⟩:

- In the cyrillization of Chinese it is used for [t͡ʂ], equivalent to pinyin ⟨zh⟩.

⟨чч⟩:

- Aghul: [t͡ʃːʰ]
- Avar: [t͡ʃː]
- Tabasaran: [tʃːʰ]

⟨чъ⟩:

- Adyghe: [t͡ʂ]
- Ossetian: [t͡ʃʼ]

⟨чӀ⟩:

- Abaza: [t͡ɕʼ]
- Adyghe: [t͡ʂʼ]
- Aghul: [t͡ʃʼ]
- Archi: [t͡ʃʼ]
- Avar: [t͡ʃʼ]
- Chechen: [t͡ʃʼ]
- Dargwa: [t͡ʃʼ]
- Ingush [t͡ʃʼ]
- Lezgian: [t͡ʃʼ]
- Tabasaran: [tʃʼ]

⟨чӀв⟩:

- Abaza: [t͡ʃʷʼ]
- Archi: [t͡ʃʷʼ]

⟨чӀчӀ⟩:

- Avar: [t͡ʃːʼ]

⟨чʼ⟩:

- Itelmen: [t͡ʃʼ]

== Џ ==
⟨џь⟩:

- Abkhaz: [d͡ʒ]

== Ш ==
⟨шв⟩:

- Abaza: [ʃʷ]
- Archi: [ʃʷ]
- Tabasaran: [ʃʷ]

⟨шч⟩:

- Russian: [ɕː] (though this is a predictable effect of assimilation, and therefore not a true digraph)

⟨шъ⟩:

- Adyghe: [ʂ]

⟨шъу⟩:

- Adyghe: [ʃʷ]

⟨шь⟩:

- Abkhaz: [ʃ]

⟨шә⟩:

- Abkhaz: [ʃʷ]

⟨шӀ⟩:

- Abaza: [t͡ʃʼ]
- Adyghe: [ʃʼ]

⟨шӀу⟩:

- Adyghe: [ʃʷʼ]

== Щ ==
⟨щв⟩:

- Archi: [ʃːʷ]

⟨щӀ⟩:

- Kabardian: [ɕʼ]

== Ы ==
⟨ыӀ⟩:

- Tsakhur: [ɨˤ]

== Э ==
⟨эй⟩:

- Shughni: [ɛj]

⟨эр⟩:

- Dungan: [aɻ]

⟨ээ⟩:

- Archi: [eː]
- Shughni: [eː]

⟨ээӀ⟩:

- Archi: [eːˤ]

⟨эӀ⟩:

- Archi: [eˤ]

== Ю ==
⟨юй⟩:

- In the cyrillization of Chinese it is used for [y], equivalent to pinyin ⟨yu⟩.

⟨юь⟩:

- Chechen: [jy]

== Я ==
⟨ян⟩:

- Dungan: [jæ̃]

⟨яь⟩:

- Chechen: [jæ]
- Ingush [jæ]

== Ӏ ==
⟨Ӏу⟩:

- Adyghe: [ʔʷ]
- Kabardian: [ʔʷ]

⟨Ӏь⟩:

- Budukh: [ʔ̰]
- Kabardian (dialectal): [h]

== See also ==
- Cyrillic alphabets
- Cyrillic digraphs
- List of Cyrillic letters
- Pentagraph
- Tetragraph
