= Ali Shogentsukov =

Kabardian teacher, writer and translator

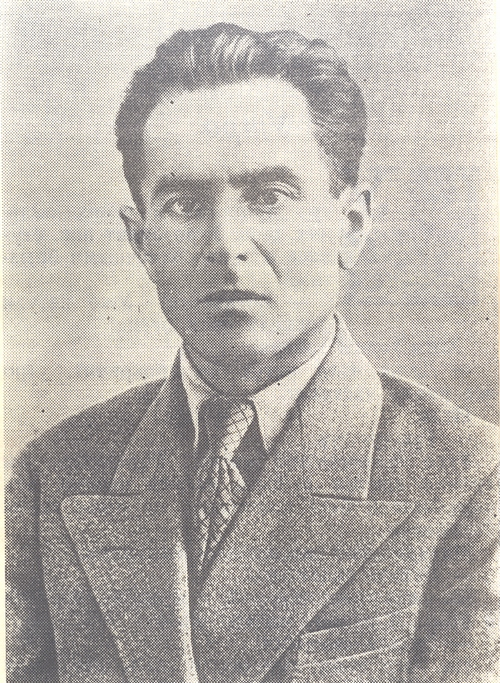

Ali Askhatovich Shogentsukov (Russian: Али́ Асха́дович Шогенцу́ков, Kabardian: ЩоджэнцIыкIу Iэсхьэд и къуэ Алий; 28 October 1900, Bekhisen, Terek Oblast – 29 November 1941, Babruysk, Belarus) was a Kabardian teacher, writer and translator, and the founder of literature in the Kabardian language.

== Life ==
He studied at the madrasa and the Pedagological Institute of Bekhisen and later in Istanbul, later on he came back to Kabardino-Balkaria, where he worked as a teacher.

In autumn 1941, he died in a Nazi concentration camp.

== Works ==
- Стиххэмрэ поэмэхэмрэ 1938
- Хьэжыгъэ пут закъуэ : Рассказ, 1940
- Ныбжьыщ1э хахуэ: Поэма, 1940
