= Besleney dialect =

East Circassian dialect

Besleney
- Beslenei, Beslenej
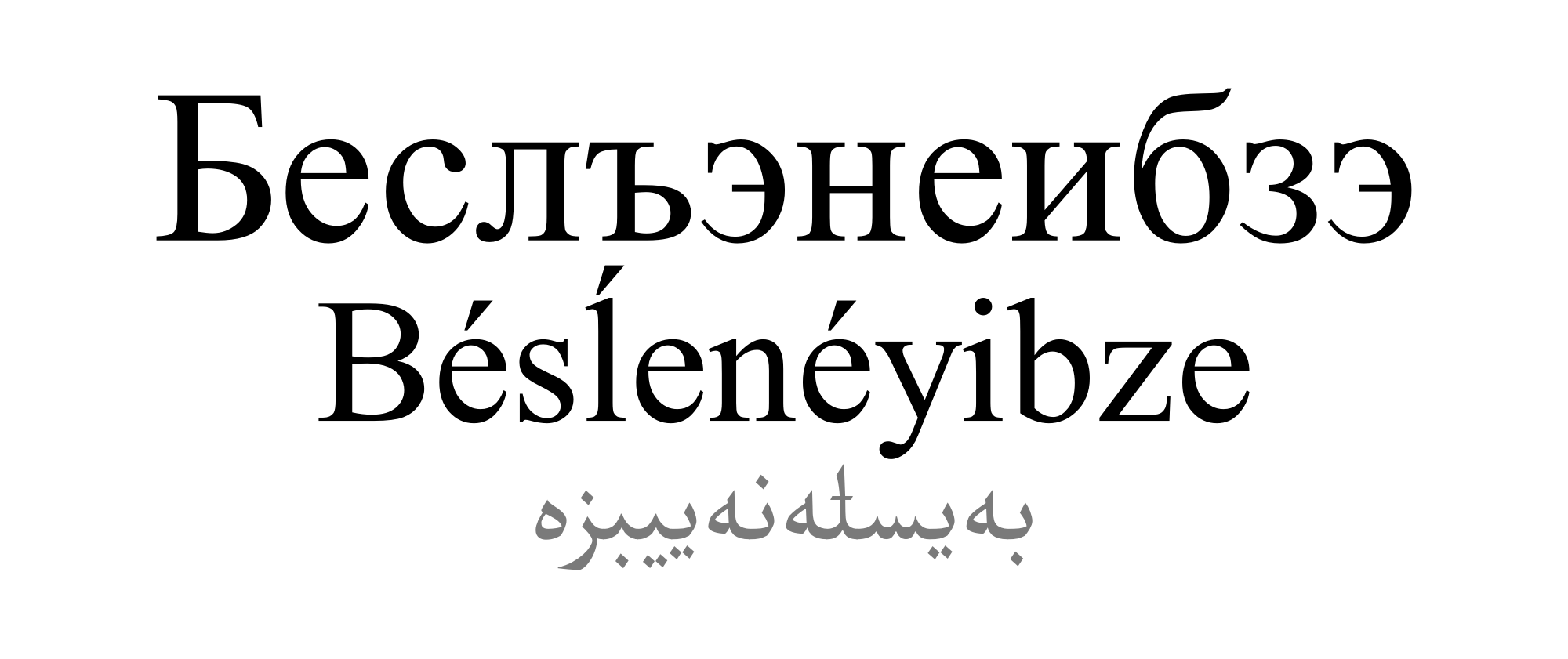
- "Besleney dialect" written in the Cyrillic, the ABX Latin and the now-defunct Perso-Arabic scripts.
- Native to: Turkey
- Ethnicity: Circassians: Besleney
- Language family: Northwest Caucasian: Circassian; East Circassian (Kabardian); Besleney

Official status
- Official language in: Besleney Principality (historically)

Language codes
- ISO 639-3: –
- Linguist List: kbd-bes
- Glottolog: None

The Besleney dialect (Beslenej, Adyghe: Беслъэнэибзэ; Kabardian: Беслъэнеибзэ) is a dialect of the East Circassian language, spoken by the Besleney subgroup of Circassians. However, because the Besleney tribe lived at the center of Circassia, the Besleney dialect also shares a large number of features with dialects of Western Circassian and functions as a transitional linguistic link between the West Circassian (Adyghe) and East Circassian (Kabardian) languages.

== Phonology ==
The Besleney dialect is characterized by its conservatism. Unlike Modern Standard Kabardian, Besleney was not affected by the two major phonological shifts (Phase 1 and Phase 2) that defined the evolution of the Kabardian dialects. Consequently, Besleney preserves the original consonant inventory of Proto-Kabardian.

=== Retention of Palatalized Velars (No Phase 2) ===
Besleney did not undergo "Phase 2" (Velar Palatalization). It retains the distinct Proto-Kabardian series of palatalized velars: the voiced stop [ɡʲ] ⟨гь⟩, the voiceless stop [kʲ] ⟨кь⟩, and the ejective [kʲʼ] ⟨кӀь⟩.

In most other dialects, including Standard Kabardian, these consonants shifted forward to become palato-alveolar affricates (d͡ʒ, t͡ʃ, t͡ʃʼ).

- Besleney [ɡʲ] ⟨гь⟩ (retained) vs Standard Kabardian [d͡ʒ] ⟨дж⟩:

Meaning	Besleney (Proto-Kabardian Form)		Standard Kabardian	
Meaning	Cyrillic	IPA	Cyrillic	IPA
chicken	гьэд	ɡʲad	джэд	d͡ʒad
cat	гьэду	ɡʲadəw	джэду	d͡ʒadəw
shirt	гьанэ	ɡʲaːna	джанэ	dʒaːna
to study to read	егьэн	jaɡʲan	еджэн	jadʒan
glass	абгь	ʔaːbgʲ	абдж	ʔaːbd͡ʒ
game	гьэгу	ɡʲagʷ	джэгу	d͡ʒagʷ
bitter	дыгь	dəɡʲ	дыдж	dəd͡ʒ
sick	сымагьэ	səmaːɡʲa	сымаджэ	səmaːd͡ʒa
evil	бзагьэ	bzaːɡʲa	бзаджэ	bzaːd͡ʒa
valley	къуэлагьэ	qʷalaːɡʲa	къуэладжэ	qʷalaːd͡ʒa
noon	щэгьагъуэ	ɕaɡʲaːʁʷa	шэджагъуэ	ʃad͡ʒaːʁʷa
infidel	гьаур	ɡʲaːwər	джаур	d͡ʒaːwər
girl	хъыгьэбз	χəɡʲabz	хъыджэбз	χəd͡ʒabz

- Besleney [kʲ] ⟨кь⟩ (retained) vs Standard Kabardian [t͡ʃ] ⟨ч⟩:

Meaning	Besleney (Proto-Kabardian Form)		Standard Kabardian	
Meaning	Cyrillic	IPA	Cyrillic	IPA
throat	кьий	kʲəj	чий	t͡ʃəj
spleen	кьэ	kʲa	чэ	t͡ʃa
to cough	пскьэн	pskʲan	псчэн	pst͡ʃan

- Besleney [kʲʼ] ⟨кӀь⟩ (retained) vs Standard Kabardian [t͡ʃʼ] ⟨чӀ⟩ (written as ⟨кӀ⟩):

Meaning	Besleney (Proto-Kabardian Form)		Standard Kabardian	
Meaning	Cyrillic	IPA	Cyrillic	IPA
ceiling	кӀьафэ	kʲʼaːfa	кӀафэ	t͡ʃʼaːfa
rope	кӀьапсэ	kʲʼaːpsa	кӀапсэ	t͡ʃʼaːpsa
gun	кӀьэрахъуэ	kʲʼaraːχʷa	кӀэрахъуэ	t͡ʃʼaraːχʷa
long	кӀьыхь	kʲʼəħ	кӀыхь	t͡ʃʼəħ
to kill	укӀьын	wkʲʼən	укӀын	wt͡ʃʼən
to move away	ӀукӀьын	ʔʷəkʲʼən	ӀукӀын	ʔʷət͡ʃʼən
key	ӀункӀьыбзэ	ʔʷənkʲʼəbza	ӀункӀыбз	ʔʷənt͡ʃʼəbz
beard	жьакӀьэ	ʑaːkʲʼa	жьакӀэ	ʑaːt͡ʃʼa
poor	тхьэмыщкӀь	tħaməɕkʲʼ	тхьэмыщкӀэ	tħaməɕt͡ʃʼa
to be ashamed	укӀьытэн	wəkʲʼətan	укӀытэн	wət͡ʃʼətan
short	кӀьагуэ	kʲʼaːɡʷa	кӀагуэ	t͡ʃʼaːɡʷa
tail	кӀьэ	kʲʼa	кӀэ	t͡ʃʼa

=== Retention of Affricates (No Phase 1) ===
Besleney did not undergo "Phase 1" (Spirantization). It retains the original Proto-Kabardian postalveolar and retroflex affricates: [d͡ʒ] ⟨дж⟩, [t͡ʃ] ⟨ч⟩, [t͡ʃʼ] ⟨чӀ⟩ and [d͡ʐ] ⟨дж⟩.

In Standard Kabardian, these original affricates underwent spirantization, becoming the fricatives [ʒ] ⟨ж⟩, [ʃ] ⟨ш⟩, and [ɕʼ] ⟨щӀ⟩.

The following table demonstrates how Besleney retains the affricates (matching Proto-Kabardian), while Standard Kabardian has shifted them to fricatives.

Besleney Retention vs Standard Kabardian Shift
Meaning	Besleney / Proto-Kabardian (Retained Affricate)	Standard Kabardian (Shifted Fricative)
fox	⟨баджэ⟩ (baːd͡ʒa)	⟨бажэ⟩ (baːʒa)
village	⟨къуаджэ⟩ (qʷaːd͡ʒa)	⟨къуажэ⟩ (qʷaːʒa)
village	⟨джылэ⟩ (d͡ʒəɮa)	⟨жылэ⟩ (ʒəɮa)
night	⟨джэщ⟩ (d͡ʒaɕ)	⟨жэщ⟩ (ʒaɕ)
cow	⟨джэм⟩ (d͡ʒam)	⟨жэм⟩ (ʒam)
spear	⟨бджы⟩ (bd͡ʒə)	⟨бжы⟩ (bʒə)
goat	⟨бджэн⟩ (bd͡ʒan)	⟨бжэн⟩ (bʒan)
to run	⟨джэн⟩ (d͡ʒan)	⟨жэн⟩ (ʒan)
to sleep	⟨джеин⟩ (d͡ʒajən)	⟨жеин⟩ (ʒajən)
to come out from under	⟨чӀэкӀьын⟩ (t͡ʃʼ)	⟨щӀэкӀьын⟩ (ɕʼ)
to regret	⟨чӀэгъуэжын⟩ (t͡ʃʼ)	⟨щӀэгъуэжын⟩ (ɕʼ)
mustache	⟨пачӀэ⟩ (t͡ʃʼ)	⟨пащӀэ⟩ (ɕʼ)
new	⟨чӀэ⟩ (t͡ʃʼa)	⟨щӀэ⟩ (ɕʼa)
winter	⟨чӀымахуэ⟩ (t͡ʃʼəmaːxʷa)	⟨щӀымахуэ⟩ (ɕʼəmaːxʷa)
young-man	⟨чӀалэ⟩ (t͡ʃʼaːla)	⟨щӀалэ⟩ (ɕʼaːla)
guest	⟨хьачӀэ⟩ (ħaːt͡ʃʼa)	⟨хьащӀэ⟩ (ħaːɕʼa)
area	⟨чӀыпӀэ⟩ (t͡ʂʼəpʼa)	⟨щӀыпӀэ⟩ (ɕʼəpʼa)
iron	⟨гъучӀы⟩ (ʁʷət͡ʂʼə)	⟨гъущӀы⟩ (ʁʷəɕʼə)
to sleep	⟨джеин⟩ / ⟨джен⟩ (d͡ʒajən)	⟨жеин⟩ (ʒajən)
tree	⟨джыг⟩ (d͡ʒəɣ)	⟨жыг⟩ (ʒəɣ)
to run	⟨джэн⟩ (d͡ʒan)	⟨жэн⟩ (ʒan)
to run down	⟨еджэхын⟩ (jad͡ʒaxən)	⟨ежэхын⟩ (jaʒaxən)
he-goat	⟨аджэ⟩ (aːd͡ʒa)	⟨ажэ⟩ (aːʒa)
door	⟨бджэ⟩ (bd͡ʒa)	⟨бжэ⟩ (bʒa)

=== Comparison of Phases ===
Because Besleney was affected by neither Phase 1 nor Phase 2, words that are merged or shifted in Standard Kabardian remain distinct in Besleney.

The following table shows how words like "new" (which underwent Phase 1 in Std. Kabardian) and "tail" (which underwent Phase 2 in Std. Kabardian) are distinct in Besleney.

Word	Besleney (No Shift)	Other Kabardian dialects (Phase 1 only)	Modern Standard Kabardian (Phase 1 & 2)
tail	kʲʼa ⟨кӀьэ⟩	kʲʼa ⟨кӀьэ⟩	t͡ʃʼa ⟨кӀэ⟩
new	t͡ʃʼa ⟨чӀэ⟩	ʃʼa ⟨щӀэ⟩	ʃʼa ⟨щӀэ⟩
winter	t͡ʃʼəmaːxʷa ⟨чӀымахуэ⟩	ʃʼəmaːxʷa ⟨щӀымахуэ⟩	ʃʼəmaːxʷa ⟨щӀымахуэ⟩
mustache	paːt͡ʃʼa ⟨пачӀэ⟩	paːʃʼa ⟨пащӀэ⟩	paːʃʼa ⟨пащӀэ⟩

== Grammar ==
Unlike Modern Kabardian, Baslaney doesn't use the prefix н-. It uses the prefix къ- in all cases.

Besleney vs Standard Kabardian
Meaning	Besleney / Proto-Kabardian	Standard Kabardian
I look at you	⟨Сыкъоплъ⟩	⟨Сыноплъ⟩
I looked at you	⟨Сыкъоплъа⟩	⟨Сыноплъащ⟩
I look at y'all	⟨Сыкъывоплъ⟩	⟨Сынывоплъ⟩
I looked at y'all	⟨Сыкъывоплъа⟩	⟨Сынывоплъащ⟩

== See also ==
- Hakuchi Adyghe dialect
- Shapsug Adyghe dialect
- Bzhedug Adyghe Dialect
- Abzakh Adyghe dialect
