= Alveolar lateral fricative =

Alveolar lateral fricative may refer to:

- Voiceless alveolar lateral fricative
- Alveolar lateral ejective fricative
- Voiced alveolar lateral fricative
