= Besleney =

Circassian tribe

Беслъэнейхэр
- The tamga of the Qanoqo princely dynasty of the Besleney and the Circassian flag

Languages
- Circassian (Besleney Kabardian dialect), Turkish, Russian

Religion
- Islam (Sunni Islam)

The Besleney (Circassian: Беслъэней, Kabardian pronunciation: [basɬənəj]; Russian: Бесленеевцы) are one of the twelve major Circassian tribes, representing one of the twelve stars on the green-and-gold Circassian flag. They histirocally lived in the Principality of Besleney in Circassia. By character, culture and language, the Besleney are closest to Kabardians. The princely house of the Besleney was Qanoqo.

== Population ==
The majority of the Besleney live in the valley of Bolshaya and Malaya Laba Rivers and on the bank of Urup in the Russian Republics of Karachay-Cherkessia, Krasnodar Krai and Adygea. They also extend to the valleys of Chetem, Fars, Psefir, Kuban (Western Circassia).

== Language ==
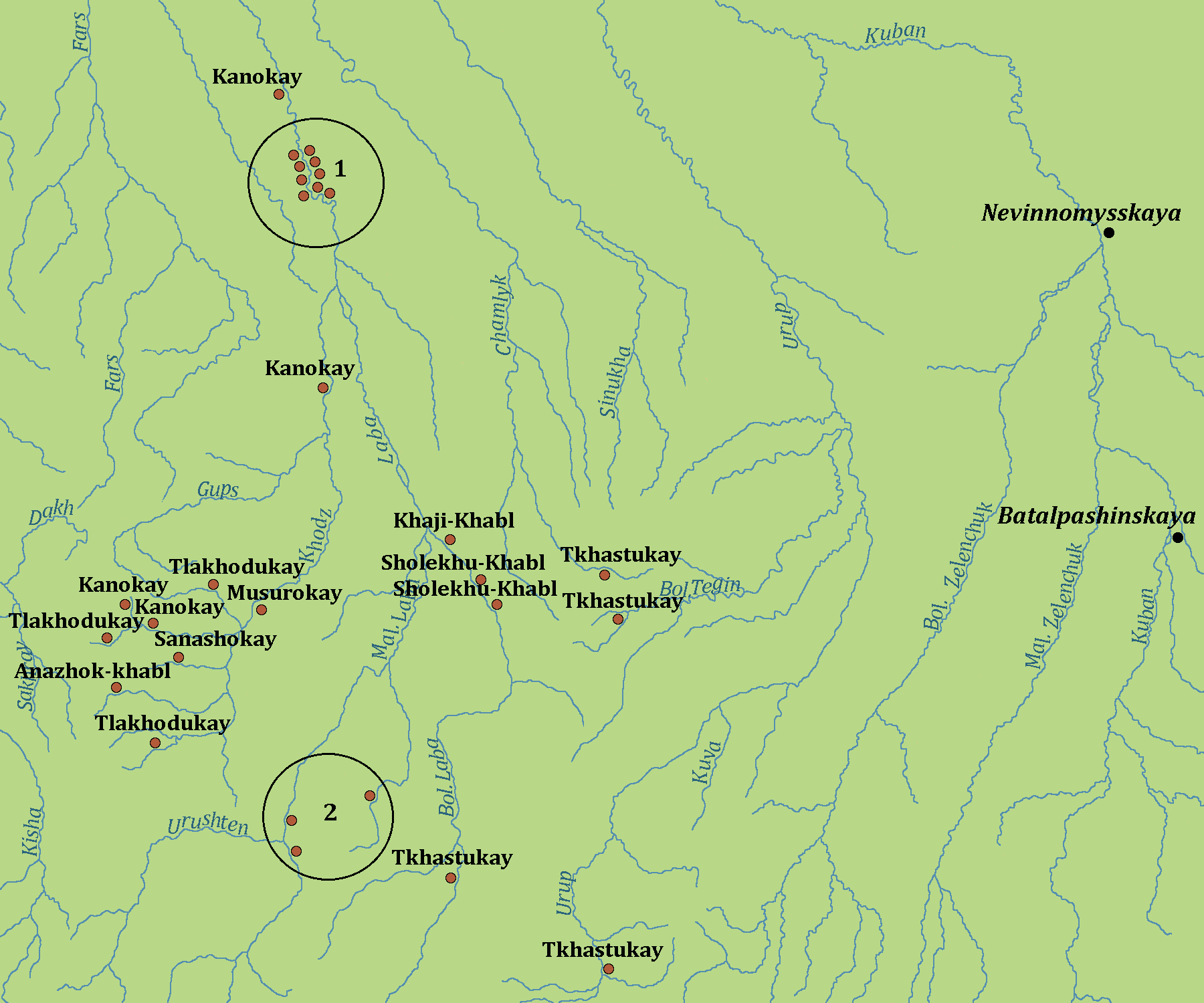
Besleney villages of Circassia around 1830–1850; "1" denotes nine villages resettled from the mountains by General Grigory Zass; "2" denotes villages whose names are unknown; The area of village concentration in the upper reaches of the Laba River tributaries is now part of Krasnodar Krai between Adygea to the north and Karachay-Cherkessia to the south

The Besleney people speak the Besleney sub-dialect (Adyghe: Бэслъыныйбзэ) of the Kabardian Adyghe dialect (East Circassian). However, because the Besleney tribe lived at the center of Circassia, the Besleney dialect also shares a large number of features with dialects of the West Adyghe dialect. Like the Adyghe Shapsug sub-dialect, there exist a palatalized voiced velar plosive [ɡʲ], a palatalized voiceless velar plosive [kʲ] and a palatalized velar ejective [kʲʼ], which were merged to [d͡ʒ], [t͡ʃ] and [t͡ʃʼ] in other Circassian dialects. The Besleney dialect also has an alveolar lateral ejective affricate [t͡ɬʼ], which corresponds to an alveolar lateral ejective fricative [ɬʼ] in most other varieties of Circassian. The Besleney dialect has a voiceless glottal fricative [h] that corresponds to [x] in other Circassian dialects.

Meaning	Besleney sub-dialect		Standard Kabardian		Standard Adyghe		Shapsug sub-dialect	
Meaning	Cyrillic	IPA	Cyrillic	IPA	Cyrillic	IPA	Cyrillic	IPA
horse	чъы	[t͡ʂɘ]	шы	[ʃɘ]	шы	[ʃɘ]	шы	[ʃɘ]
sister	чъыпхъу	[t͡ʂɘpχʷ]	шыпхъу	[ʃɘpχʷ]	шыпхъу	[ʃɘpχʷ]	шыпхъу	[ʃɘpχʷ]
wedding	нысачъэ	[nɘsaːt͡ʂɐ]	нысашэ	[nɘsaːʃɐ]	нысашэ	[nɘsaːʃɐ]	нысашэ	[nɘsaːʃɐ]
day	махуэ	[maːxʷɐ]	махуэ	[maːxʷɐ]	мафэ	[maːfɐ]	мафэ	[maːfɐ]
black	фӏыцӏэ	[fʼɘt͡sʼɐ]	фӏыцӏэ	[fʼɘt͡sʼɐ]	шӏуцӏэ	[ʃʷʼɘt͡sʼɐ]	шӏусӏэ	[ʃʷʼɘsʼɐ]
shirt, dress	гьанэ	[ɡʲaːnɐ]	джанэ	[d͡ʒaːnɐ]	джанэ	[d͡ʒaːnɐ]	гьанэ	[ɡʲaːnɐ]
tree	джыг	[d͡ʒɘɣ]	жыг	[ʒɘɣ]	чъыгы	[t͡ʂɘɡɘ]	чъыгы	[t͡ʃɘɣɘ]
four	птлӏы	[pt͡ɬʼɘː]	плӏы	[pɬʼɘː]	плӏы	[pɬʼɘː]	плӏы	[pɬʼɘː]
man	тлӏы	[t͡ɬʼɘː]	лӏы	[ɬʼɘː]	лӏы	[ɬʼɘː]	лӏы	[ɬʼɘː]
chicken	гьэд	[gɐd]	джэд	[d͡ʒɐd]	чэты	[t͡ʃɐtɘ]	кьэт	[kʲɐt]
tail, seed	кӏьэ	[kʲʼɐ]	кӏэ	[t͡ʃʼɐ]	кӏэ	[t͡ʃʼɐ]	кӏьэ	[kʲʼɐ]
young man, boy	кӏалэ	[t͡ʃʼaːlɐ]	щӏалэ	[ɕʼaːɮɐ]	кӏалэ	[t͡ʃʼaːɮɐ]	кӏалэ	[t͡ʃʼaːlɐ]
new	кӏэ	[t͡ʃʼɐ]	щӏэ	[ɕʼɐ]	кӏэ	[t͡ʃʼɐ]	кӏэ	[t͡ʃʼɐ]

== See also ==
- Principality of Besleney
- East Adyghe dialect
- West Adyghe dialect
- Hatuqay dialect
- Other Circassian tribes
- Rescue of Leningrad Jewish children in Beslenei
