= Lām with bar =

- ݪ

Usage
- Writing system: Arabic script
- Type: Abjad
- Language of origin: Adyghe language (Historically); Chadian National Alphabet; Kabardian language (Historically); Kalami language; Marwari language
- Sound values: [ɬ], [ɭ]
- In Unicode: U+076A

History
- Development: 𐤋: ܠ; 𐡋; ل; ݪ

Other
- Writing direction: right to left

ݪ (Unicode name: Arabic Letter Lam With Bar, code point U+076A) is an additional letter of the Arabic script, derived from lām (ل) with the addition of a bar. It is not used in the Arabic alphabet itself, but is used in Marwari to represent a retroflex lateral flap [𝼈], and in Kalami as well as in the Chadian National Alphabet to represent a voiceless lateral fricative, [ɬ]). Historically, in Adyghe and Kabardian, two Circassian languages, this letter also represented a voiceless lateral fricative, [ɬ]).
