= Kabardian language =

Northwest Caucasian language natively spoken by Circassians

Kabardian
- Kabardian-Circassian; East Circassian
- адыгэбзэ (къэбэрдейбзэ); Adıǵebze (Keberdéybze) آد‍ہگەبزە (قەبەردەییبزە)
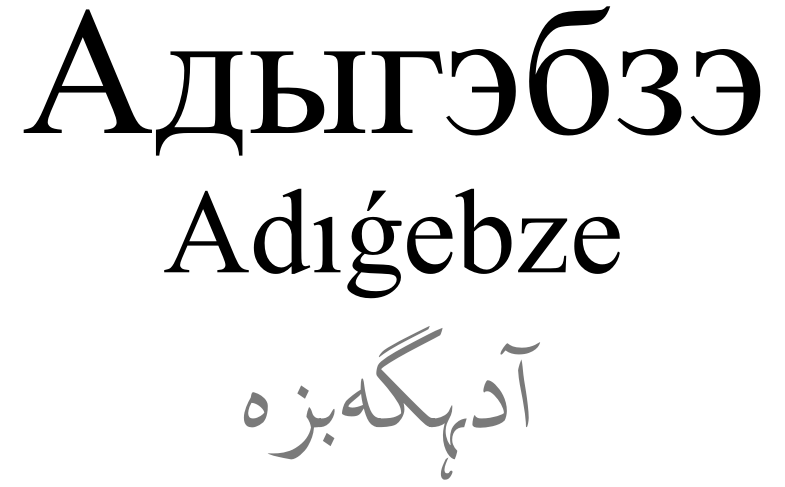
- T‌he Kabardian self-designation Ādəgăbză; that is, "Adyghe language" written in the Cyrillic script, the ABX Latin script and the now-defunct Perso-Arabic variant
- Pronunciation: [qɜbɜrˈdeːbzɜ]Qeberdieibze
- Native to: North Caucasus (in parts of Kabardino-Balkaria and Karachay-Cherkessia)
- Region: North Caucasus (Circassia)
- Ethnicity: Kabardians, Cherkesogai
- Native speakers: 1.9 million (2020)
- Language family: Northwest Caucasian: Circassian; Kabardian
- Early forms: Proto-Northwest Caucasian: Proto-Circassian; Proto-Kabardian
- Dialects: Kabardian; Besleney
- Writing system: Cyrillic script Latin script Perso-Arabic script

Official status
- Official language in: Russia: Kabardino-Balkaria; Karachay-Cherkessia
- Recognised minority language in: Jordan; Syria

Language codes
- ISO 639-2: kbd
- ISO 639-3: kbd
- Glottolog: kaba1278
- Kabardian is classified as Vulnerable by the UNESCO Atlas of the World's Languages in Danger.

Yinal speaking Kabardian.

Kabardian (/kəˈbɑːrdiən/), (Note: Kabardian: Къэбэрдей-Адыгэбзэ, romanized: Qeberdiei-Adygebze, lit. 'Kabardian Circassian' Kabardian: [qɜbɜrˈdeːbzɜ]; Adyghe: Kъэбэртай-Aдыгабзэ/Kъэбэртайбзэ, romanized: Qebertai-Adygabze/Qebertaibze) also known as East Circassian and Kabardian-Circassian, is a Northwest Caucasian language spoken by the eastern subgroups of Circassians. Native to Circassia in the Caucasus, it is official in Kabardino-Balkaria and Karachay-Cherkessia, but is mostly spoken in the Circassian diaspora.

Kabardian is closely related to the Adyghe or West Circassian language; some reject the distinction between the two languages in favour of both being dialects of a unitary Circassian language. Despite phonological differences, Circassian languages are reciprocally intelligible, with speakers being able to communicate. While the self-designation for both Adyghe and Kabardian is Adyghe, in linguistic and administrative terms, "Adyghe" refers specifically to the language of the western tribes of Circassians, while "Kabardian" refers to the language of the two eastern tribes (Kabardians and Besleney). Ubykh, Abkhaz and Abaza are more distantly related to Kabardian.

The language has 47 or 48 consonant phonemes, of which 22 or 23 are fricatives, depending upon whether one counts [h] as phonemic, but it has only 3 phonemic vowels. It is one of very few languages to possess a clear phonemic distinction between ejective affricates and ejective fricatives. Like all other Northwest Caucasian languages, Kabardian is an ergative language and has an extremely complex verbal system.

Kabardian is written in a form of Cyrillic and serves as the literary language for Circassians in both Kabardino-Balkaria (where it is usually called the "Kabardian language") and Karachay-Cherkessia (where it is called the "Cherkess language"). Arabic- and Latin-based writing systems have also been historically used for the language.

Since 2004, the Turkish broadcasting corporation TRT has maintained a half-an-hour programme a week in the Terek dialect of Kabardian.

== Dialects ==
- East Circassian
  - Kabardian
    - West Kabardian
      - Kuban
      - Kuban-Zelenchuk (Cherkess)
    - Central Kabardian
      - Baksan (basis for the literary language)
      - Malka
    - Eastern Kabardian
      - Terek
      - Mozdok
    - North Kabardian
      - Mulka
      - Zabardiqa (1925 until 1991 Soviet Zaparika)
  - Baslaney dialect (Adyghe: Бэслъыныйбзэ)

== Phonology ==
The phoneme written Л л is pronounced as a voiced alveolar lateral fricative [ɮ] mostly by the Circassians of Kabarda and Cherkessia, but many Kabardians pronounce it as an alveolar lateral approximant [l] in diaspora. The series of labialized alveolar sibilant affricates and fricatives that exist in Adyghe /ʃʷʼ/ /ʒʷ/ /ʃʷ/ /t͡sʷ/ became labiodental consonants /fʼ/ /v/ /f/ /v/ in Kabardian, for example the Kabardian words мафӀэ [maːfʼa] "fire", зэвы [zavə] "narrow", фыз [fəz] "wife" and вакъэ [vaːqa] "shoe" are pronounced as машӀо [maːʃʷʼa], зэжъу [zaʒʷə], шъуз /ʃʷəz/ and цуакъэ [t͡sʷaːqa] in Adyghe. Kabardian has a labialized voiceless velar fricative [xʷ] which correspond to Adyghe [f], for example the Adyghe word "тфы" ([tfə] "five" is тху ([txʷə]) in Kabardian. In the Beslenei dialect, there exists an alveolar lateral ejective affricate [t͡ɬʼ] which corresponds to [ɬʼ] in literary Kabardian. The Turkish Kabardians (Uzunyayla) and Besleneys have a palatalized voiced velar stop [ɡʲ] and a palatalized velar ejective [kʲʼ] which corresponds to [d͡ʒ] and [t͡ʃʼ] in literary Kabardian.

=== Consonants ===
Kabardian consonant system
| | | Labial | Alveolar | | Post- alveolar | Alveolo- palatal | Velar | | | Uvular | | Pharyngeal | Glottal | |
| | | Labial | Median | Lateral | Post- alveolar | Alveolo- palatal | plain | lab. | pal. | plain | lab. | Pharyngeal | plain | lab. |
|---|---|---|---|---|---|---|---|---|---|---|---|---|---|---|
| Nasal | | m м | n н | | | | | | | | | | | |
| Plosive | ejective | pʼ пӀ | tʼ тӀ | | | | | kʷʼ кӀу | (kʲʼ)^{1} кӀ | | | | | |
| Plosive | voiceless | p п | t т | | | | k^{2} к | kʷ ку | | q къ | qʷ къу | | ʔ Ӏ | ʔʷ Ӏу |
| Plosive | voiced | b б | d д | | | | ɡ^{2} г | ɡʷ гу | (ɡʲ)^{1} дж | | | | | |
| Affricate | ejective | | t͡sʼ цӀ | | t͡ʃʼ кӀ | | | | | | | | | |
| Affricate | voiceless | | t͡s ц | | t͡ʃ ч | | | | | q͡χ кхъ | q͡χʷ кхъу | | | |
| Affricate | voiced | | d͡z дз | | d͡ʒ дж | | | | | | | | | |
| Fricative | ejective | fʼ фӀ | | ɬʼ лӀ | | ɕʼ щӀ | | | | | | | | |
| Fricative | voiceless | f ф | s с | ɬ лъ | ʃ ш | ɕ щ | x х | xʷ ху | | χ хъ | χʷ хъу | ħ хь | | |
| Fricative | voiced | v в | z з | ɮ л | ʒ ж | ʑ жь | ɣ г | | | ʁ гъ | ʁʷ гъу | | | |
| Approximant | | | | l л | | j й | | w у | | | | | | |
| Trill | | | r р | | | | | | | | | | | |

1. In some Kabardian dialects (e.g. Baslaney dialect, Uzunyayla dialect), there is a palatalized voiced velar stop [ɡʲ] and a palatalized velar ejective [kʲʼ] that were merged with [d͡ʒ] and [t͡ʃʼ] in most Kabardian dialects. For example, the Baslaney words "гьанэ" [ɡʲaːna] "shirt" and "кӀьапсэ" [kʲʼaːpsa] "rope" are pronounced in other Kabardian dialects as "джанэ" [d͡ʒaːna] and кӀапсэ [t͡ʃʼaːpsa].
2. Consonants that exist only in borrowed words.

The glottalization of the ejective stops (but not fricatives) can be quite weak, and has been reported to often be creaky voice, that is, to have laryngealized voicing. Something similar seems to have happened historically in the Veinakh languages.

=== Vowels ===
Kabardian has a vertical vowel system. Although many surface vowels appear, they can be analyzed as consisting of at most the following three phonemic vowels: /ə/, /a/ and /aː/.

The following allophones of the short vowels /ə/, /a/ appear:

| Feature | Description | Not preceding labialized cons. | | Preceding labialized cons. | |
| Feature | Description | /ə/ | /a/ | /ə/ | /a/ |
|---|---|---|---|---|---|
| [+high, -back] | After laterals, palatalized palatovelars and /j/ | [i] | [e] | [y] | [ø] |
| [-round, +back] | After plain velars, pharyngeals, /h/, /ʔ/ | [ɨ] | [ɑ] | [ʉ] | [ɒ] |
| [+round, +back] | After labialized palatovelars, uvulars and laryngeals | [u] | [o] | [u] | [o] |
| [-high, -back] | After other consonants | [ə] | [æ] | ? | ? |

According to Kuipers,

These symbols must be understood as each covering a wide range of sub-variants. For example, i stands for a sound close to cardinal [i] in 'ji' "eight", for a sound close to English [ɪ] in "kit" in the word x'i "sea", etc. In fact, the short vowels, which are found only after consonants, have different variants after practically every series defined as to point of articulation and presence or absence of labialization or palatalization, and the number of variants is multiplied by the influence of the consonant (or zero) that follows.

Most of the long vowels appear as automatic variants of a sequence of short vowel and glide, when it occurs in a single syllable:

- [uː] = /əw/
- [oː] = /aw/
- [iː] = /əj/
- [eː] = /aj/

This leaves only the vowel [aː]. Kuipers claims that this can be analyzed as underlying /ha/ when word-initial, and underlying /ah/ elsewhere, based on the following facts:

- [h] occurs only in the plural suffix [ha], which does not occur word-initially.
- [aː] is the only word-initial vowel; analyzing it as /ha/ makes the language underlyingly universally consonant-initial.
- Certain complications involving stress and morphophonemic alternations are dramatically simplified by these assumptions.

Halle finds Kuipers' analysis "exemplary". Gordon and Applebaum note this analysis, but also note that some authors disagree, and as a result prefer to maintain a phoneme /aː/.

In a later section of his monograph, Kuipers also attempts to analyze the two vowels phonemes /ə/ and /a/ out of existence. Halle, however, shows that this analysis is flawed, as it requires the introduction of multiple new phonemes to carry the information formerly encoded by the two vowel phonemes.

The vowel /o/ appears in some loan words; it is often pronounced /aw/.

The diphthong /aw/ is pronounced [oː] in some dialects. /əj/ may be realised as [iː], /əw/ as [uː] and /aj/ as [eː]. This monophthongisation does not occur in all dialects.

The vowels /a, aː/ can have the semi-vowel /j/ in front of it.

== Orthography ==
The official alphabet used for writing Kabardian is the Cyrillic alphabet, including additional letters, totalling 59 letters. Digraphs, trigraphs, and one tetragraph, are counted as independent letters on their own. The Cyrillic alphabet in its current form has been the official alphabet since 1938. Kabardian alphabet, while having minor differences reflecting dialectical variations, is very similar to orthography of the Adyghe language, the other prominent Circassian language.

Kabardian is also unofficially written and taught in Latin, in some diaspora communities, especially in Turkey where government-backing of a Latin-based script has been a cause for controversy and opposition among Kabardians who still overwhelmingly favor Cyrillic.

=== History ===
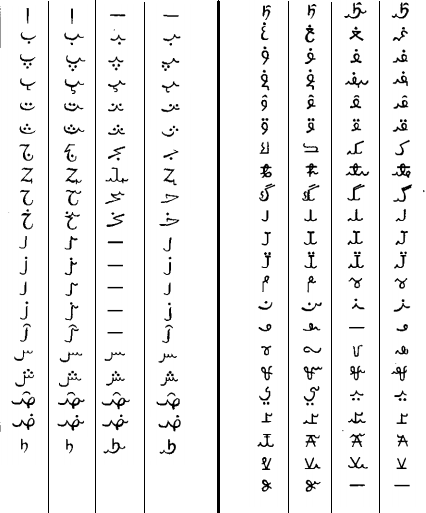
Nogma's Arabic alphabet (1825)

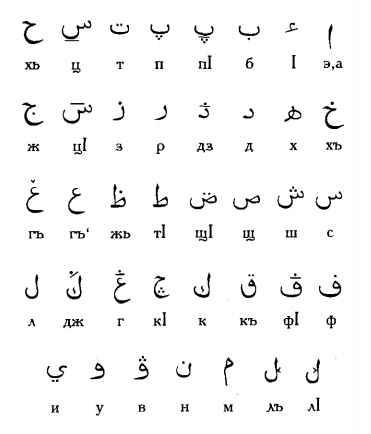
Bekmurza Pachev's Arabic alphabet (1881)

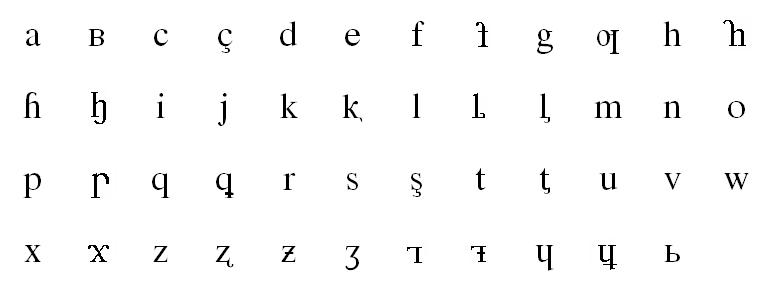
The Latin alphabet for Kabardian, 1930 version

Prior to the 19th century, Kabardian did not have a literary tradition yet, and it did not have a native orthography. At the time, Ottoman Turkish was used as the literary language by Circassians. Starting in the 1820s, efforts at compiling and standardizing Arabic-based scripts were undertaken by various Kabardian literaturists, and by the early 1920s, an officially-adopted Perso-Arabic-based script was in widespread educational and literary use. However, in 1924, Kabardian Arabic alphabet was discarded and replaced with Latin. A second version of Latin script was adopted in 1930. This lasted for another 6 years, and in 1936, Latin alphabet was discarded in favour of Cyrillic. Kabardian Cyrillic alphabet underwent an iteration of modification in 1938, and the 1938 version has been in popular and official use ever since.

The first ever notable attempt at compiling an orthography for Kabardian was conducted by famous Kabardian poet, Sh. Nogma, in 1825. His alphabet consisted of 42 letters, including 15 letters introduced by him, some of which had unusual forms, diverging from the conventional rasm (base of letters which are then used for addition of dots and diacritics). His alphabet thus did not take hold.

In 1830, in collaboration with Russian philologist and orientalist, Gratsilevsky, Nogma developed a Cyrillic-based script for Kabardian.

In 1865, an alphabet book in a Kabardian orthography similar to that of Abkhaz was written by Kazi Atazhukin, based on an orthography used by Peter von Uslar in 1862. It is as follows:

| а | б | в | β | г | ӷ | гᷱ | д |
| ҩ | е | ж | з | ӡ | z | һ | і |
| ј | к | қ | л | м | н | о | п |
| ԥ | ԛ | ԛᷱ | | р | с | ҫ | т |
| ҭ | у | ф | х | х̓ | ц |
| ш | ղ | ղᷱ | ѵ |

Over the decades, the popularity in use of Arabic-derived script increased. In 1881, the poet Bekmurza Pachev compiled a standardized Perso-Arabic script for Kabardian consisting of 39 letters. He published various literature and wrote poetry in this version of the alphabet. The Arabic alphabet was gaining universal acceptance and increasing usage among Kabardian Circassians.

In 1908, Nuri Tsagov compiled another iteration of the Perso-Arabic alphabet, better suited for all consonant and vowel phonemes of Kabardian. This version of the alphabet was widely accepted, with many authors utilizing it to publish books and literature, including a primer. The alphabet gained official status in education and later also inspired the standardization of Arabic-based orthography for Adyghe language by Akhmetov Bekukh.

In line with the general linguistic policy of the Soviet Union at the time, the existing Perso-Arabic script was replaced with a newly developed Kabardian Latin alphabet in 1924. Khuranov is credited for first compiling the first version of Latin alphabet in May 1923. This version closely resembled the Latin alphabet adopted for Adyghe language in 1927. This alphabet consisted of many newly created letters, some even borrowed from Cyrillic. Another interesting feature of this iteration of Adyghe Latin Alphabet was that there was no distinction between lower case and upper case letters. Each letter only had one single case. The alphabet consisted of а b w d g ꜧ е ӡ z ž ⱬ i j k ⱪ q qh l lh m n o p ph r s š ş t th v f fh x х̌ ɦ c ç ch y h u è ù â ỳ.

Kabardian Latin alphabet underwent another update in 1925. In this version, many of the newly created letters were removed in favour of introduction of accents and diacritics over base Latin letters. In this version, upper-case/lower-case distinction was reintroduced. The alphabet consisted of the following letters: A a, B b, V v, D d, E e, G g, Gu gu, Z z, Ž ž, Z̧ z̧, Ӡ ӡ, Ꜧ ꜧ, Ꜧu ꜧu, I i, J j, K k, Ku ku, Ⱪ ⱪ, Ⱪu ⱪu, Q q, Qu qu, Qh qh, Qhu qhu, L l,, Lh lh, M m, N n, O o, P p, Ph ph, R r, S s, Š š, Ş ş, T t, Th th, U u, F f, Fh fh, X x, Xu xu, X̌ x̌, X̌u x̌u, ɦ, C c, Ç ç, Ch ch, Y y, H h, ', Ù ù, Je je, Jo jo, Ju ju, Ja ja.

In 1930, the Kabardian Latin alphabet was replaced by a new version derived from the nationally-adopted new standard, Yañalif.

In 1936, Kabardian was one of the languages in the Soviet Union to switch to Cyrillic alphabet. Tuta Borukaev, Kabardian public figure and linguist is credited with the compilation of the first official Cyrillic alphabet for Kabardian. They consisted of the following: А а, 'А 'а, Б б, В в, Г г, Гъ гъ, Д д, Е е, Ж ж, Жь жь, З з, И и, Й й, К к, К' к', Л л, Ль ль, Л' л', М м, Н н, О о, П п, П' п', Р р, С с, Т т, Т' т', У у, 'У 'у, Ф ф, Ф' ф', Х х, Хь хь, Хъ хъ, Ц ц, Ц' ц', Ч ч, Ш ш, Щ щ, Щ' щ', Ъ ъ, Ы ы, Ь ь, Э э, Ю ю, Я я. The extensive reliance on use of apostrophes made the alphabet inconvenient to learn and use. Thus two years later, in 1938, N.F. Yakovlev led a commission that reformed the Cyrillic alphabet to its present form.

Among the diasporic Circassian communities, the situation with respect to orthography has been more complex. Some groups have advocated for use of Latin or Arabic in line with the language of the larger society in which Circassian communities reside. On the other hand, since the adoption of Cyrillic in Circassia others have advocated for continued use of Cyrillic as it helps maintain contact with the Circassian homeland and the literary tradition there. This divergence goes back to the early 20th century, when in 1909, Muhammad Pchegatlukov developed a new and independent Arabic-based writing system in the Ottoman Empire. His proposed script did not manage to displace the main orthography of the time in the Circassian homeland, i.e. Nuri Tsagov's script.

More recently, there has been developments in Turkey. In the 2000s, the Konya-based Adyghe Language Teaching Association (ADDER) has compiled a Latin alphabet for Kabardian. While many in the Circassian community have opposed the move, the endorsement of the project by Turkey's ruling party, AK Party, has resulted in the boosting of ADDER script and its usage in development of new educational material. The alphabet consists of the following letters:A a, B b, C c, Ç ç, Ć ć, D d, E e, É é, F f, Ḟ ḟ, G g, Ǵ ǵ, Ğ ğ, H h, Ḣ ḣ, I ı, İ i, J j, Ĵ ĵ, K k, Ḱ ḱ, Ǩ ǩ, L l, Ĺ ĺ, M m, N n, O o, Ö ö, P p, Ṕ ṕ, Q q, R r, S s, Ś ś, Š š, Ş ş, Ṩ ṩ, T t, Ṫ ṫ, U u, Ü ü, W w, V v, X x, Y y, Z z, Ź ź, '

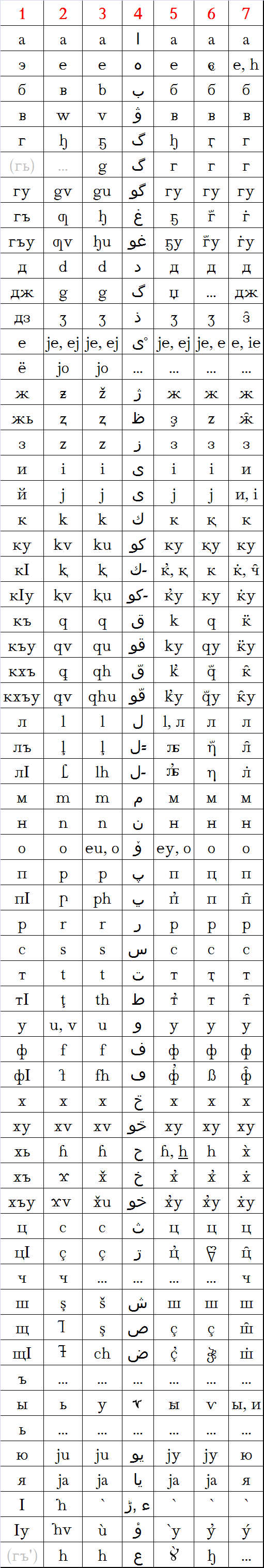
1 – modern alphabet, 2 – alphabet of 1930, 3 – Khuranov's alphabet, 4 – Tsagov's alphabet, 5 – Lopatin's alphabet, 6 – Atazhukin's alphabet, 7 – Nogma's alphabet

=== Cyrillic alphabet ===
Kabardian alphabet
| А а [aː] | Э э [a] | Б б [b] | В в [v] | Г г [ɣ] | Гу гу [ɡʷ] | Гъ гъ [ʁ] | Гъу гъу [ʁʷ] |
| Д д [d] | Дж дж [d͡ʒ] or [ɡʲ] | Дз дз [d͡z] | Е е [ja/aj] | Ё ё [jo] | Ж ж [ʒ] | Жь жь [ʑ] | З з [z] |
| И и [jə/əj] | Й й [j] | К к [k] | Ку ку [kʷ] | Къ къ [q] | Къу къу [qʷ] | Кхъ кхъ [q͡χ] | Кхъу кхъу [q͡χʷ] |
| КӀ кӀ [t͡ʃʼ] or [kʲʼ] | КӀу кӀу [kʷʼ] | Л л [ɮ] or [l] | Лъ лъ [ɬ] | ЛӀ лӀ [ɬʼ] | М м [m] | Н н [n] | О о [aw/wa] |
| П п [p] | ПӀ пӀ [pʼ] | Р р [r] | С с [s] | Т т [t] | ТӀ тӀ [tʼ] | У у [w/əw] | Ф ф [f] |
| ФӀ фӀ [fʼ] | Х х [x] | Ху ху [xʷ] | Хъ хъ [χ] | Хъу хъу [χʷ] | Хь хь [ħ] | Ц ц [t͡s] | ЦӀ цӀ [t͡sʼ] |
| Ч ч [t͡ʃ] | Ш ш [ʃ] | Щ щ [ɕ] | ЩӀ щӀ [ɕʼ] | Ъ ъ [ˠ] | Ы ы [ə] | Ь ь [ʲ] | Ю ю [ju] |
| Я я [jaː] | Ӏ [ʔ] | Ӏу [ʔʷ] | | | | | |

Lower-case palochka, ⟨ӏ⟩, is found in handwriting. Usually, palochka uppercase and lowercase forms consistent in print or upright, but only upper-case ⟨Ӏ⟩ is normally used in computers.

In the Kabardian alphabet, certain letters have dual pronunciations. КӀ is pronounced either as [kʼ] or as [t͡ʃʼ] (like ЧӀ), and Дж is pronounced either as [ɡʲ] (Гь) or as [d͡ʒ]. This variation is due to a historical sound shift: in Proto-Kabardian, these letters were originally [ɡʲ] and [kʼ], but they shifted to [d͡ʒ] and [t͡ʃʼ] in the majority of modern Kabardian dialects.

The table below lists the 59-letter Kabardian Cyrillic alphabet. Dighraphs, trigraphs, and a tetragraph are counted as independent letters.

| Cyrillic | IPA | Perso-Arabic (before 1924) | Scholarly transliteration | ADDER transliteration | BGN/PCGN transliteration |
|---|---|---|---|---|---|
| А а | [aː] | ا | Ā ā | A a Á á | A a |
| Э э | [a] | ئە / ە | Ă ă | E e | Ä ä |
| Б б | [b] | ب | B b | B b | B b |
| В в | [v] | ۋ | V v | V v | V v |
| Г г | [ɣ] | گ | G g | Ǵ ǵ | G g |
| Гу гу | [ɡʷ] | گو | G˚ g˚ | Gu gu | Gw gw |
| Гъ гъ | [ʁ] | غ | Ġ ġ | Ğ ğ | Gh gh |
| Гъу гъу | [ʁʷ] | غو | Ġ˚ ġ˚ | Ğu ğu | Ghw ghw |
| Д д | [d] | د | D d | D d | D d |
| Дж дж | [d͡ʒ] or [ɡʲ] | ج | Ǯʹ ǯʹ | C c | J j |
| Дз дз | [d͡z] | ذ | Ʒ ʒ | Ź ź | Dz dz |
| Е е | [ja/aj] | ئە / ەی | E e | É é | E e |
| Ё ё (Note: Only in loanwords.) | [jo] | - | - | - | Yë yë Ë ë |
| Ж ж | [ʒ] | ژ | Ž ž | J j | Zh zh |
| Жь жь | [ʑ] | ظ | Ẑ ẑ | Ĵ ĵ | Ź ź |
| З з | [z] | ز | Z z | Z z | Z z |
| И и | [jə/əj] | ئی / ی | I i | İ i | I i |
| Й й | [j] | ی | J j | Y y | Y y |
| К к | [k] | ک | K k | K k | K k |
| Ку ку | [kʷ] | کو | K˚ k˚ | Ku ku | Kw kw |
| Кӏ кӏ | [t͡ʃʼ] or [kʲʼ] | ࢰ | Č̣ʼ č̣ʼ | Ć ć Q q | K' k' |
| Кӏу кӏу | [kʷʼ] | ࢰو | Ḳ˚ ḳ˚ | Qu qu | Kw' kw' |
| Къ къ | [q] | ق | Q̇ q̇ | K k | Q' q' |
| Къу къу | [qʷ] | قو | Q̇˚ q̇˚ | Ku ku | Qw' qw' |
| Кхъ кхъ | [q͡χ] | ٯّ | Q q | Ǩ ǩ | Q q |
| Кхъу кхъу | [q͡χʷ] | ٯّو | Q˚ q˚ | Ǩu ǩu | Qw qw |
| Л л | [ɮ] or [l] | ل | L l | L l | L l |
| Лъ лъ | [ɬ] | ݪ | Ł ł | Ĺ ĺ | Lh lh |
| Лӏ лӏ | [ɬʼ] | ࢦ | Ḷ ḷ | Ĺ' ĺ' | L' l' |
| М м | [m] | م | M m | M m | M m |
| Н н | [n] | ن | N n | N n | N n |
| О о | [ɜw] [wa] | ئۆ / ۆ | O o | O o Ö ö | O o |
| П п | [p] | پ | P p | P p | P p |
| Пӏ пӏ | [pʼ] | ٮ | Ṗ ṗ | Ṕ ṕ | P' p' |
| Р р | [r] | ر | R r | R r | R r |
| С с | [s] | س | S s | S s | S s |
| Т т | [t] | ت | T t | T t | T t |
| Тӏ тӏ | [tʼ] | ط | Ṭ ṭ | Ṫ ṫ | T' t' |
| У у | [w/əw] | و | W w U u | W w U u | W w U u |
| Ф ф | [f] | ف | F f | F f | F f |
| Фӏ фӏ | [fʼ] | ڡ | F̣ f̣ | Ḟ ḟ | F' f' |
| Х х | [x] | ݗ | X x | X x | Kh kh |
| Ху ху | [xʷ] | ݗو | X˚ x˚ | Xu xu | Khw khw |
| Хь хь | [ħ] | ح | Ḥ ḥ | H h | H̱ ẖ |
| Хъ хъ | [χ] | خ | Ꭓ ꭓ | Ḣ ḣ | X x |
| Хъу хъу | [χʷ] | خو | Ꭓ˚ ꭓ˚ | Ḣu ḣu | Xw xw |
| Ц ц | [t͡s] | ث | C c | Ś ś | Ts ts |
| Цӏ цӏ | [t͡sʼ] | ڗ | C̣ c̣ | Š š | Ts' ts' |
| Ч ч | [t͡ʃ] | چ | Čʼ čʼ | Ç ç | Ch ch |
| Ш ш | [ʃ] | ش | Š š | Ṩ ṩ | Sh sh |
| Щ щ | [ɕ] | ص | Ŝ ŝ | Ş ş | Ś ś |
| Щӏ щӏ | [ɕʼ] | ض | Ṣ̂ ṣ̂ | Ş' ş' | Ś' ś' |
| Ъ ъ | [ˠ] | - | - | - | ˮ |
| Ы ы | [ə] | ئہ‍ / ‍ہ‍ | Ə ə | I ı | Y y |
| Ь ь | [ʲ] | - | - | - | ʼ |
| Ю ю | [ju] | یو | Ju ju | Yu yu | Yu yu |
| Я я | [jaː] | یا | Jā jā | Ya ya | Ya ya |
| Ӏ ӏ | [ʔ] | ئ | ʾ | ' | ' |
| Ӏу ӏу | [ʔʷ] | ؤ | ʾ˚ | 'u | 'w |

=== ADDER Latin alphabet ===
Since the genocide and forced expulsion of Circassians in their homeland in the second half of the 19th century, most Circassians have been living as diaspora communities in countries such as Turkey, Syria, Jordan, and elsewhere. In fact, more Circassians live in the diaspora than within Circassia. As far as orthographic conventions among diasporic communities is concerned, a majority of diaspora Circasians have tried to follow the conventions and literary practices in place among people living in the Circassian homeland. This is to help diaspora communities maintain ties to their homeland. Therefore, before 1924, the Arabic-based scripts developed for Western and Eastern (Kabardian) Circassian, also took roots among the diaspora communities. This is also why for the past decades up till today, the majority of Circassians, be they in Turkey or Jordan or elsewhere, have adopted the Cyrillic alphabet and insist on educating the new generation in Cyrillic alphabet.

Nevertheless, the issue of orthography has not been without controversy among diaspora communities. In the 2000s in Turkey, the Konya-based Adyghe Language Teaching Association (ADDER) has compiled a Latin alphabet for Kabardian. While many in the Circassian community have opposed the move, the endorsement of the project by Turkey's ruling party, AK Party, has resulted in the boosting of ADDER script. Since then, government-endorsed education material and primers have been prepared in ADDER Latin script.

Table below lists the 49-letter Kabardian Latin (ADDER) alphabet and their respective Cyrillic equivalents. Highlighted letters are not considered independent letters, but are digraphs and are used to correspond to specific Kabardian phonemes.

| A a [aː] А а | Á á [aː] А а | B b [b] Б б | C c [d͡ʒ] or [ɡʲ] Дж дж | Ć ć [t͡ʃʼ] КӀ кӀ | Ç ç [t͡ʃ] Ч ч | D d [d] Д д | E e [a] Э э |
| É é [ja/aj] Е е | F f [f] Ф ф | Ḟ ḟ [fʼ] ФӀ фӀ | F f [f] Ф ф | G g [ɡʷ] Г(у) г(у) | Ǵ ǵ [ɣ] Г г | Ğ ğ [ʁ] Гъ гъ | H h [ħ] Хь хь |
| Ḣ ḣ [χ] Хъ хъ | I ı [ə] Ы ы | İ i [jə/əj] И и | J j [ʒ] Ж ж | Ĵ ĵ [ʑ] Жь жь | K k [q] Къ къ | Ḱ ḱ [k] К к | Ǩ ǩ [q͡χ] Кхъ кхъ |
| L l [ɮ] or [l] Л л | Ĺ ĺ [ɬ] Лъ лъ | Ĺ' ĺ' [ɬʼ] ЛӀ лӀ | M m [m] М м | N n [n] Н н | O o [ɜw] [wa] О о / Ӏо | Ö ö [ʔʷa] Ӏуе | P p [p] П п |
| Ṕ ṕ [pʼ] ПӀ пӀ | Q q [kʷʼ] КӀ(у) кӀ(у) | R r [r] Р р} | S s [s] С с | Ś ś [t͡s] Ц ц | Š š [t͡sʼ] ЦӀ цӀ | Ş ş [ɕ] Щ щ | Ş' ş' [ɕʼ] ЩӀ щӀ |
| Ṩ ṩ [ʃ] Ш ш | T t [t] Т т | Ṫ ṫ [tʼ] ТӀ тӀ | U u [əw] У у / Ӏу | Ü ü [ʔʷə] Ӏуи | W w [w] У у | V v [v] В в | X x [x] Х х |
| Y y [j] Й й | Z z [z] З з | Ź ź [d͡z] Дз дз | ' [ʔ] Ӏ ӏ | | | | |

=== Kabardian Arabic alphabet ===
Below table shows Kabardian Perso-Arabic alphabet, as it was the official script of Kabardian Circassian between 1908 and 1924, compiled by Nuri Tsagov.

| Forms | | | | IPA | Kabardian Cyrillic Equivalent | Scholarly transliteration | Unicode | Notes |
| Isolated | Final | Medial | Initial | IPA | Kabardian Cyrillic Equivalent | Scholarly transliteration | Unicode | Notes |
|---|---|---|---|---|---|---|---|---|
| ا | ـا | ـا | آ | [aː] | А а | Ā ā | U+0622; U+0627 | |
| ئ | ـئ | ـئـ | ئـ | [ʔ] | Ӏ ӏ | ʾ | U+0626 | 1. This letter plays another role as well. It precedes a vowel letter at the beginning of a word, with the exception of آ (equivalent to Cyrillic А а) |
| ؤ | ـؤ | - | - | [ʔʷ] | Ӏу | ʾ˚ | U+0624 | |
| ە | ـە | - | ئە | [a] | Э э Е е^{1} | Ă ă E e | U+06D5 | 1. The sound equivalent to Cyrillic letter "Е е" is represented by a digraph ئەیـ / ئەی / ـەی / ەی. |
| ‍ہ‍ | ـہ‍ | ـہـ | ئہـ | [ə] | Ы ы | Ə ə | U+06C1 and U+200D^{1} | 1. The main character consists of U+06C1 (ـہ / ہ), and is always written in medial form. Thus, the use of Zero-width joiner (U+200D) may be necessary based on context. Below are sample scenarios: صہص; د‍ہص; صہ‍; د‍ہ‍ |
| ب | ـب | ـبـ | بـ | [b] | Б б | B b | U+0628 | |
| ت | ـت | ـتـ | تـ | [t] | Т т | T t | U+062A | |
| ث | ـث | ـثـ | ثـ | [t͡s] | Ц ц | C c | U+062B | |
| پ | ـپ | ـپـ | پـ | [p] | П п | P p | U+067E | |
| ٮ | ـٮ | ـٮـ | ٮـ | [pʼ] | ПӀ пӀ | Ṗ ṗ | U+066E | 1. Equivalent to ࢠ (U+08A0) in Adyghe Arabic alphabet. |
| ج | ـج | ـجـ | جـ | [d͡ʒ] | Дж дж | Ǯʹ ǯʹ | U+062C | |
| ح | ـح | ـحـ | حـ | [ħ] | Хь хь | Ḥ ḥ | U+062D | |
| خ | ـخ | ـخـ | خـ | [χ] | Хъ хъ | Ꭓ ꭓ | U+062E | |
| ݗ | ـݗ | ـݗـ | ݗـ | [x] | Х х | X x | U+0757 | |
| چ | ـچ | ـچـ | چـ | [t͡ʃ] | Ч ч | Čʼ čʼ | U+0686 | |
| د | ـد | - | - | [d] | Д д | D d | U+062F | |
| ذ | ـذ | - | - | [d͡z] | Дз дз | Ʒ ʒ | U+0630 | |
| ر | ـر | - | - | [r] | Р р | R r | U+0631 | |
| ز | ـز | - | - | [z] | З з | Z z | U+0632 | |
| ژ | ـژ | - | - | [ʒ] | Ж ж | Ž ž | U+0698 | |
| ڗ | ـڗ | - | - | [t͡sʼ] | ЦӀ цӀ | C̣ c̣ | U+0697 | |
| س | ـس | ـسـ | سـ | [s] | С с | S s | U+0633 | |
| ش | ـش | ـشـ | شـ | [ʃ] | Ш ш | Š š | U+0634 | |
| ص | ـص | ـصـ | صـ | [ɕ] | Щ щ | Ŝ ŝ | U+0635 | |
| ض | ـض | ـضـ | ضـ | [ɕʼ] | ЩӀ щӀ | Ṣ̂ ṣ̂ | U+0636 | |
| ط | ـط | ـطـ | طـ | [tʼ] | ТӀ тӀ | Ṭ ṭ | U+0637 | |
| ظ | ـظ | ـظـ | ظـ | [ʑ] | Жь жь | Ẑ ẑ | U+0638 | |
| ع | ـع | ـعـ | عـ | [ʔ] | Гь' гь' | ʾ | U+0639 | |
| غ | ـغ | ـغـ | غـ | [ʁ] | Гъ гъ | Ġ ġ | U+063A | |
| ف | ـف | ـفـ | فـ | [f] | Ф ф | F f | U+0641 | |
| ڡ | ـڡ | ـڡـ | ڡـ | [fʼ] | ФӀ фӀ | F̣ f̣ | U+06A1 | |
| ق | ـق | ـقـ | قـ | [q] | Къ къ | Q̇ q̇ | U+0642 | |
| ٯّ | ـٯّ | ـٯّـ | ٯّـ | [q͡χ] | Кхъ кхъ | Q q | U+066F; U+0651 | |
| ک | ـک | ـکـ | کـ | [k] | К к | K k | U+0643 | |
| گ | ـگ | ـگـ | گـ | [ɣ]/[g] ([gʷ]) | Г г | G g | U+06AF | |
| ࢰ | ـࢰ | ـࢰـ | ࢰـ | [t͡ʃʼ]/[kʼ] ([kʷʼ]) | КӀ кӀ | Č̣ʼ č̣ʼ Ḳ˚ ḳ˚ | U+08B0 | |
| ل | ـل | ـلـ | لـ | [l]/[ɮ] | Л л | L l | U+0644 | |
| ݪ | ـݪ | ـݪـ | ݪـ | [ɬ] | Лъ лъ | Ł ł | U+076A | |
| ࢦ | ـࢦ | ـࢦـ | ࢦـ | [ɬʼ] | ЛӀ лӀ | Ḷ ḷ | U+08A6 | |
| م | ـم | ـمـ | مـ | [m] | М м | M m | U+0645 | |
| ن | ـن | ـنـ | نـ | [n] | Н н | N n | U+0646 | |
| و | ـو | - | ئو / و | [u] / [w] | У у | U u W w | U+0648 | |
| ۆ | ـۆ | - | ئۆ | [ɜw] [wa] | О о | O o | U+06C6 | |
| ۋ | ـۋ | - | - | [v] | В в | V v | U+06CB | 1. Equivalent to ڤ (U+06A4) in Adyghe Arabic alphabet. |
| ی | ـی | ـیـ | ئیـ / یـ | [i] / [j] | И и Й й | I i / J j | U+06CC | |

== Grammar ==
Kabardian, like all Northwest Caucasian languages, has a basic agent–object–verb typology, and is characterized by ergative–absolutive alignment.

== Example ==
The following texts are excerpts from the official translations of the Universal Declaration of Human Rights in Kabardian and Adyghe, along with the original declaration in English.

| English | Kabardian | Adyghe |
|---|---|---|
| Universal Declaration of Human Rights | ЦӀыху Хуэфащэхэм Теухуа Дунейпсо Джэпсалъэ | ЦӀыф Фэшъуашэхэм Афэгъэхьыгъэ Дунэепстэу Джэпсалъ |
| Article 1 | 1-нэ пычыгъуэ | 1-нэрэ пычыгъу |
| All human beings are born free and equal in dignity and rights. They are endowed with reason and conscience and should act towards one another in a spirit of brotherhood. | ЦӀыху псори щхьэхуиту, я щӀыхьымрэ я хуэфащэхэмрэкӀэ зэхуэдэу къалъхур. Акъылрэ зэхэщӀыкӀ гъуазэрэ яӀэщи, зыр зым зэкъуэш зэхащІэ яку дэлъу зэхущытын хуейхэщ. | ЦӀыф пстэури шъхьэфитэу, ялъытэныгъэрэ яфэшъуашэхэмрэкӀэ зэфэдэу къалъфы. Акъылрэ зэхэшӀыкӀ гъуазэрэ яӀэшъы, зыр зым зэкъош зэхашІэ азфагу дэлъэу зэфыщытынхэ фае. |
| Transliteration | C‡yhu Huèfaŝèhèm Teuhua Dunejpso Džèpsalʺè | C‡yf Fèšʺuašèhèm Afègʺèhʹygʺè Dunèepstèu Džèpsalʺ |
| Transliteration | 1-nè pyčygʺuè | 1-nèrè pyčygʺu |
| Transliteration | C‡yhu psori ŝhʹèhuitu, â ŝ‡yhʹymrè â huèfaŝèhèmrèk‡è zèhuèdèu kʺalʺhur. Akʺylrè zèhèŝʺykʺ gʺuazèrè â‡èŝi, zyr zym zèkʺuèš zèhaŝ‡è âku dèlʺu zèhuŝytyn huejhèŝ. | C‡yf pstèuri šʺhʹèfitèu, âlʺytènygʺèrè âfèšʺuašèhèmrèk‡è zèfèdèu kʺalʺfy. Akʺylrè zèhèš‡yk‡ gʺuazèrè â‡èšʺy, zyr zym zèkʺoš zèhaš‡è azfagu dèlʹèu zèfyŝytynhè fae. |
| Pronunciation | [tsʼəxʷ xʷafaːɕaxam tajwəxʷa dəwnajpsaw dʒapsaːɬa] | [tsʼəf faʃʷaːʃaxam aːfaʁaħəʁa duːnaja pstawə dʒapsaɬ] |
| Pronunciation | [jazaːna pətʃəʁʷa] | [nara pətʃəʁʷ] |
| Pronunciation | [tsʼəxʷ psawrəj ɕħɑxʷəjtəw jaː ɕʼəħəmra jaː xʷafaːɕaxɑmratʃʼa zaxʷadawə qaːɬxʷər aːqəɮra zaxaɕʼətʃʼ ʁʷaːzara jaːʔaɕəj zər zəm zaqʷaʃ zaxaːɕʼa jaːkʷ daɬəw zaxʷəɕətən xʷajxaɕ] | [tsʼəf pstawərəj ʂħafəjtawə jaːɬətanəʁara jaːfaʂʷaːʃaxamratʃʼa zafadawə qaːɬfə aqəɮra zaxaʃʼətʃʼ ʁʷaːzara jaːʔaʃə zər zəm zaqʷaʃ azfaːgʷ daɬawə zafəɕətənxa faːja] |
