= Voiceless uvular affricate =

Consonantal sound represented by ⟨qχ⟩ in IPA

qχ

qꭓ

Audio sample
- source · help

Encoding
- X-SAMPA: q_X
Image

A voiceless uvular affricate is a type of consonantal sound, used in some spoken languages. The symbols in the International Phonetic Alphabet that represent this sound are ⟨q͡χ⟩ and ⟨q͜χ⟩. The tie bar may be omitted, yielding ⟨qχ⟩.

== Features ==
Features of a voiceless uvular affricate:

- Its manner of articulation is affricate, which means it is produced by first stopping the airflow entirely, then allowing air flow through a constricted channel at the place of articulation, causing turbulence.
- Its place of articulation is uvular, which means it is articulated with the back of the tongue (the dorsum) at the uvula.
- Its phonation is voiceless, which means it is produced without vibrations of the vocal cords. In some languages the vocal cords are actively separated, so it is always voiceless; in others the cords are lax, so that it may take on the voicing of adjacent sounds.
- It is an oral consonant, which means that air is not allowed to escape through the nose.
- It is a median consonant, which means it is produced by directing the airstream down the midline of the tongue, rather than to the sides.
- Its airstream mechanism is pulmonic, which means it is articulated by pushing air only with the intercostal muscles and abdominal muscles, as in most speech sounds.

== Occurrence ==
=== Uvular ===
Language		Word	IPA	Meaning	Notes
Alemannic	Most High and Highest Alemannic dialects	Gschänk	[ˈkʃæɴq͡χ]	'present'	Velar [k͡x] in other dialects.
Adyghe	Natukhai	кхъэ / ٯّ‍‍ە	[q͡χa]	'grave'	Dialectal. Corresponds to [qʰ] in other dialects.
Avar		хъарахъ / څ‍ﺎراڅ	[q͡χʰːaˈraq͡χʰː]	'bush'	Contrasts with the ejective [q͡χʼː].
Chechen		кхаара / qaara / قآآرآ	[q͡χaʔara]	'Wednesday'	
Chukchi		ӈирэӄ / ňirèḳ	[ŋireq͡χ]	'two'	Allophone of [q].
English	Scouse	clock	[kl̥ɒq͡χ]	'clock'	Possible word-final realization of /k/.
Georgian	Some dialects	აფხაზეთი	[apʰq͡χazetʰi]	'Abkhazia'	Only after bilabial stops. Otherwise [x].
Kabardian		кхъэ / ٯّ‍‍ە	[q͡χa]	'grave'	
Persian	Some dialects	ﻗﻔﻞ	[q͡χofl]	'lock'	Lenition of word-initial /q/.
Rendille		munkhet	[munq͡χet]	'forgotten'	Only after nasal consonants. Otherwise [x].

=== Pre-uvular ===
There is also a voiceless pre-uvular affricate reported for Uzbek, which is articulated slightly more front compared with the place of articulation of a prototypical voiceless uvular affricate, though not as front as the prototypical voiceless velar affricate. The International Phonetic Alphabet does not have a separate symbol for that sound, though it can be transcribed as ⟨q̟͡χ̟⟩ or ⟨q᫈͜ꭓ᫈⟩ (both symbols denote an advanced ⟨q͡χ⟩) or ⟨k̠͡x̠⟩ (retracted ⟨k͡x⟩).

Language	Word	IPA	Meaning	Notes
Uzbek	quruq / قوروق	[q᫈uɾ̪uq᫈͜ꭓ᫈]	'dry'	Allophone of /q/ in word-final and preconsonantal positions.

== See also ==
- Index of phonetics articles

== Notes ==
Place →	Labial					Coronal										Dorsal					Laryngeal			
Manner ↓	Bilabial		Labiodental		Linguolabial		Dental		Alveolar		Postalveolar		Retroflex		(Alveolo-)palatal		Velar		Uvular		Pharyngeal/epiglottal		Glottal	
Nasal	m̥	m	ɱ̊	ɱ		n̼	n̪̊	n̪	n̥	n	n̠̊	n̠	ɳ̊	ɳ	ɲ̊	ɲ	ŋ̊	ŋ	ɴ̥	ɴ				
Plosive	p	b	p̪	b̪	t̼	d̼	t̪	d̪	t	d			ʈ	ɖ	c	ɟ	k	ɡ	q	ɢ	ʡ		ʔ	
Sibilant affricate							t̪s̪	d̪z̪	ts	dz	t̠ʃ	d̠ʒ	tʂ	dʐ	tɕ	dʑ								
Non-sibilant affricate	pɸ	bβ	p̪f	b̪v			t̪θ	d̪ð	tɹ̝̊	dɹ̝	t̠ɹ̠̊˔	d̠ɹ̠˔			cç	ɟʝ	kx	ɡɣ	qχ	ɢʁ	ʡʜ	ʡʢ	ʔh	
Sibilant fricative							s̪	z̪	s	z	ʃ	ʒ	ʂ	ʐ	ɕ	ʑ								
Non-sibilant fricative	ɸ	β	f	v	θ̼	ð̼	θ	ð	θ̠	ð̠	ɹ̠̊˔	ɹ̠˔	ɻ̊˔	ɻ˔	ç	ʝ	x	ɣ	χ	ʁ	ħ	ʕ	h	ɦ
Approximant		β̞		ʋ				ð̞		ɹ		ɹ̠		ɻ		j		ɰ						˷
Tap/flap		ⱱ̟		ⱱ					ɾ̥	ɾ			ɽ̊	ɽ						ɢ̆		ʡ̆		
Trill	ʙ̥	ʙ							r̥	r		r̠	ɽ̊r̥	ɽr					ʀ̥	ʀ	ʜ	ʢ		
Lateral affricate									tɬ	dɮ			tꞎ	d𝼅	c𝼆	ɟʎ̝	k𝼄	ɡʟ̝						
Lateral fricative							ɬ̪		ɬ	ɮ			ꞎ	𝼅	𝼆	ʎ̝	𝼄	ʟ̝						
Lateral approximant								l̪	l̥	l		l̠	ɭ̊	ɭ	ʎ̥	ʎ	ʟ̥	ʟ		ʟ̠				
Lateral tap/flap									ɺ̥	ɺ			𝼈̊	𝼈		ʎ̆		ʟ̆						

		BL	LD	D	A	PA	RF	P	V	U
Implosive	Voiced	ɓ			ɗ		ᶑ	ʄ	ɠ	ʛ
Implosive	Voiceless	ɓ̥			ɗ̥		ᶑ̊	ʄ̊	ɠ̊	ʛ̥
Ejective	Stop	pʼ			tʼ		ʈʼ	cʼ	kʼ	qʼ
Ejective	Affricate		p̪fʼ	t̪θʼ	tsʼ	t̠ʃʼ	tʂʼ	tɕʼ	kxʼ	qχʼ
Ejective	Fricative	ɸʼ	fʼ	θʼ	sʼ	ʃʼ	ʂʼ	ɕʼ	xʼ	χʼ
Ejective	Lateral affricate				tɬʼ			c𝼆ʼ	k𝼄ʼ	q𝼄ʼ
Ejective	Lateral fricative				ɬʼ					
Click (top: velar; bottom: uvular)	Tenuis	kʘ qʘ		kǀ qǀ	kǃ qǃ		k𝼊 q𝼊	kǂ qǂ		
Click (top: velar; bottom: uvular)	Voiced	ɡʘ ɢʘ		ɡǀ ɢǀ	ɡǃ ɢǃ		ɡ𝼊 ɢ𝼊	ɡǂ ɢǂ		
Click (top: velar; bottom: uvular)	Nasal	ŋʘ ɴʘ		ŋǀ ɴǀ	ŋǃ ɴǃ		ŋ𝼊 ɴ𝼊	ŋǂ ɴǂ	ʞ	
Click (top: velar; bottom: uvular)	Tenuis lateral				kǁ qǁ					
Click (top: velar; bottom: uvular)	Voiced lateral				ɡǁ ɢǁ					
Click (top: velar; bottom: uvular)	Nasal lateral				ŋǁ ɴǁ					
