= Velar ejective stop =

Consonantal sound represented by ⟨kʼ⟩ in IPA

kʼ
- IPA number: 109 + 401

Audio sample
- source · help

Encoding
- Entity (decimal): &#107;&#700;
- Unicode (hex): U+006B U+02BC
- X-SAMPA: k_>
Image

A velar ejective is a type of consonantal sound, used in some spoken languages. The symbol in the International Phonetic Alphabet that represents this sound is ⟨kʼ⟩.

== Features ==
Features of a velar ejective:

- Its manner of articulation is occlusive, which means it is produced by obstructing airflow in the vocal tract. Since the consonant is also oral, with no nasal outlet, it is a plosive.
- Its place of articulation is velar, which means it is articulated with the back of the tongue (the dorsum) at the soft palate.
- Its phonation is voiceless, which means it is produced without vibrations of the vocal cords.
- It is an oral consonant, which means that air is not allowed to escape through the nose.
- It is a median consonant, which means it is produced by directing the airstream down the midline of the tongue, rather than to the sides.
- The airstream mechanism is ejective (glottalic egressive), which means the air is forced out by pumping the glottis upward.

== Occurrence ==
Language		Word	IPA	Meaning	Notes
Abkhaz		акы/aky	[akʼə]	'one'	
Adyghe	Temirgoy	шкӏэ/س̈ڃە/šč̣ʼǎ	[ʃkʼa]	'calf'	
Adyghe	Shapsug	кӏьэ / ڃیە / č̣yė	[kʲʼa]	'tail'	Palatalized. Corresponds to [t͡ʃʼ] in other dialects.
Amharic		ቀን/ḳän	[kʼɜn]	'day'	
Archi		кIан/k'an	[kʼan]	'bottom'	
Armenian	Yerevan dialect	կեղծ/kekhts	[kʼɛʁt͡sʼ]	'false'	Some speakers. Corresponds to tenuis [k⁼] in most speakers and other Eastern dialects.
Armenian	Tbilisi dialect	կարմիր/karmir	[kʼɑɹmiɹ]	'red'	
Avar		кӀул / گۇل / ḳul	[kʼuɫ]	'key'	
Chechen		кӀант/khant/ࢰانت	[kʼənt]	'boy'	
Damin		k'uu	[kʼuː]	'eye'	
English	Non-local Dublin	back	[bækʼ]	'back'	Allophone of /k/ for some speakers.
English	Northern English	back	[bækʼ]	'back'	Pre-pausal allophone of /k/ for some speakers; may be somewhat palatalised. See English phonology
English	Southern English	back	[bækʼ]	'back'	Pre-pausal allophone of /k/ for some speakers; may be somewhat palatalised. See English phonology
English	Scottish	back	[bækʼ]	'back'	Occasional word-final allophone of /k/.
Georgian		კაბა/kʼaba	[kʼɑbɑ]	'dress'	
Haida		ttsanskkaagid	[tsʼanskʼaːkit]	'beams'	
Hausa		ƙoƙari / ࢼُوْࢼَرِی	[kʼòːkʼɐ̄ɾī]	'effort'	
Kabardian	Besleney	кӏьапсэ / ࢰالسە / ćapse	[kʲʼaːpsa]	'rope'	Palatalized. Corresponds to [t͡ʃʼ] in other dialects.
Kʼicheʼ		k'ak'	[kʼaːkʼ]	'new'	
Lak		кӀлла/ⱪalla/ࢰالّا	[kʼalːa]	'rootless, foreign'	
Lezgian		кIир/k'ir	[kʼir]	'fang'	
Mpade		takʼwa	[takʼʷa]	'to vomit'	
Navajo		k'os	[kʼòs]	'cloud'	
Ossetian	Iron	къона/khona	[ˈkʼonä]	'hearth'	
Ossetian	Digoron	дзæкъолæ/dzækholæ	[d͡zəˈkʼoɫə]	'bag'	
Quechua		k'aspi	[kʼaspi]	'stick'	
Saanich		QEJTEN	[kʷʼətʃʼtən]	'salmon knife'	Labialized
Sotho					

== See also ==
- List of phonetics topics

== Notes ==
Place →	Labial					Coronal										Dorsal					Laryngeal			
Manner ↓	Bilabial		Labiodental		Linguolabial		Dental		Alveolar		Postalveolar		Retroflex		(Alveolo-)palatal		Velar		Uvular		Pharyngeal/epiglottal		Glottal	
Nasal	m̥	m	ɱ̊	ɱ		n̼	n̪̊	n̪	n̥	n	n̠̊	n̠	ɳ̊	ɳ	ɲ̊	ɲ	ŋ̊	ŋ	ɴ̥	ɴ				
Plosive	p	b	p̪	b̪	t̼	d̼	t̪	d̪	t	d			ʈ	ɖ	c	ɟ	k	ɡ	q	ɢ	ʡ		ʔ	
Sibilant affricate							t̪s̪	d̪z̪	ts	dz	t̠ʃ	d̠ʒ	tʂ	dʐ	tɕ	dʑ								
Non-sibilant affricate	pɸ	bβ	p̪f	b̪v			t̪θ	d̪ð	tɹ̝̊	dɹ̝	t̠ɹ̠̊˔	d̠ɹ̠˔			cç	ɟʝ	kx	ɡɣ	qχ	ɢʁ	ʡʜ	ʡʢ	ʔh	
Sibilant fricative							s̪	z̪	s	z	ʃ	ʒ	ʂ	ʐ	ɕ	ʑ								
Non-sibilant fricative	ɸ	β	f	v	θ̼	ð̼	θ	ð	θ̠	ð̠	ɹ̠̊˔	ɹ̠˔	ɻ̊˔	ɻ˔	ç	ʝ	x	ɣ	χ	ʁ	ħ	ʕ	h	ɦ
Approximant		β̞		ʋ				ð̞		ɹ		ɹ̠		ɻ		j		ɰ						˷
Tap/flap		ⱱ̟		ⱱ					ɾ̥	ɾ			ɽ̊	ɽ						ɢ̆		ʡ̆		
Trill	ʙ̥	ʙ							r̥	r		r̠	ɽ̊r̥	ɽr					ʀ̥	ʀ	ʜ	ʢ		
Lateral affricate									tɬ	dɮ			tꞎ	d𝼅	c𝼆	ɟʎ̝	k𝼄	ɡʟ̝						
Lateral fricative							ɬ̪		ɬ	ɮ			ꞎ	𝼅	𝼆	ʎ̝	𝼄	ʟ̝						
Lateral approximant								l̪	l̥	l		l̠	ɭ̊	ɭ	ʎ̥	ʎ	ʟ̥	ʟ		ʟ̠				
Lateral tap/flap									ɺ̥	ɺ			𝼈̊	𝼈		ʎ̆		ʟ̆						

		BL	LD	D	A	PA	RF	P	V	U
Implosive	Voiced	ɓ			ɗ		ᶑ	ʄ	ɠ	ʛ
Implosive	Voiceless	ɓ̥			ɗ̥		ᶑ̊	ʄ̊	ɠ̊	ʛ̥
Ejective	Stop	pʼ			tʼ		ʈʼ	cʼ	kʼ	qʼ
Ejective	Affricate		p̪fʼ	t̪θʼ	tsʼ	t̠ʃʼ	tʂʼ	tɕʼ	kxʼ	qχʼ
Ejective	Fricative	ɸʼ	fʼ	θʼ	sʼ	ʃʼ	ʂʼ	ɕʼ	xʼ	χʼ
Ejective	Lateral affricate				tɬʼ			c𝼆ʼ	k𝼄ʼ	q𝼄ʼ
Ejective	Lateral fricative				ɬʼ					
Click (top: velar; bottom: uvular)	Tenuis	kʘ qʘ		kǀ qǀ	kǃ qǃ		k𝼊 q𝼊	kǂ qǂ		
Click (top: velar; bottom: uvular)	Voiced	ɡʘ ɢʘ		ɡǀ ɢǀ	ɡǃ ɢǃ		ɡ𝼊 ɢ𝼊	ɡǂ ɢǂ		
Click (top: velar; bottom: uvular)	Nasal	ŋʘ ɴʘ		ŋǀ ɴǀ	ŋǃ ɴǃ		ŋ𝼊 ɴ𝼊	ŋǂ ɴǂ	ʞ	
Click (top: velar; bottom: uvular)	Tenuis lateral				kǁ qǁ					
Click (top: velar; bottom: uvular)	Voiced lateral				ɡǁ ɢǁ					
Click (top: velar; bottom: uvular)	Nasal lateral				ŋǁ ɴǁ					
