= Lendu language =

Nilo-Saharan language spoken in DR Congo

Lendu
- Balendru
- Native to: Democratic Republic of Congo
- Ethnicity: Lendu, Hema, Alur, Okebu
- Native speakers: (760,000, including Ndrulo cited 1996)
- Language family: Nilo-Saharan?: Central Sudanic; Eastern; Lenduic; Lendu
- Dialects: Badha

Language codes
- ISO 639-3: led
- Glottolog: lend1245
- Linguasphere: 03-BAD

The Lendu language is a Central Sudanic language spoken by the Balendru, an ethno-linguistic agriculturalist group residing in eastern Democratic Republic of the Congo in the area west and northwest of Lake Albert, specifically the Ituri Province. It is one of the most populous of the Central Sudanic languages. There are three-quarters of a million Lendu speakers in the DRC. A conflict between the Lendu and the Hema was the basis of the Ituri conflict.

Besides the Balendru, Lendu is spoken as a native language by a portion of the Hema, Alur, and Okebu. In Uganda, the Lendu tribe live in the districts of Nebbi and Zombo districts, northwest of Lake Albert.

== Names ==
Ethnologue gives Bbadha as an alternate name of Lendu, but Blench (2000) lists Badha as a distinct language. A draft listing of Nilo-Saharan languages, available from his website and dated 2012, lists Lendu/Badha.

== Phonology ==
=== Vowels ===
	Front	Central	Back
Close	i		u
Near-close	ɪ		ʊ
Mid	ɛ	ə	ɔ
Open		a	

=== Consonants ===
		Labial	Dental/ Alveolar		Post- alveolar	Palatal	Velar	Labial- velar	Glottal
		Labial	central	sibilant	Post- alveolar	Palatal	Velar	Labial- velar	Glottal
Nasal		m	n			ɲ	(ŋ)		
Stop/ Affricate	voiceless	p	t	t͡s	t͡ʃ		k	k͡p	ʔ
Stop/ Affricate	voiced	b	d	d͡z	d͡ʒ	ɟ	ɡ	ɡ͡b	
Stop/ Affricate	prenasal	ᵐb	ⁿd		ᶮd͡ʒ		ᵑɡ	ᵑᵐɡ͡b	
Stop/ Affricate	vl. implosive	ɓ̥	ɗ̥			ʄ̊			
Stop/ Affricate	vd. implosive	ɓ	ɗ			ʄ			
Fricative	voiceless	f	θ	s	ʃ				h
Fricative	voiced	v	ð	z	ʒ				
Fricative	prenasal			ⁿz					
Rhotic			r		ɽ				
Approximant	plain		l			j		w	
Approximant	glottalized							ʼw	

- [ŋ] is mainly heard as an allophone of /n/ when preceding velar consonants.

==== Implosives ====
Demolin (1995) posits that Lendu has voiceless implosives, /ɓ̥ ɗ̥ ʄ̊/ (/ƥ ƭ ƈ/). However, Goyvaerts (1988) had described these as creaky-voiced implosives /ɓ̰ ɗ̰ ʄ̰/, as in Hausa, contrasting with a series of modally voiced implosives /ɓ ɗ ʄ/ as in Kalabari, and Ladefoged judges that this seems to be a more accurate description.

== Grammar ==
Like many Central Sudanic languages, Lendu:

- Uses tone distinctions
- Has noun class-like system
- Uses agglutinative morphology
- Follows Subject- Verb- Object word order

== Writing system ==
Lendu is primarily an oral language, though:

- latin- based orthographies have been developed
- Religious and educational materials exist
- Bible translations have been produced

== Sociolinguistic status ==
- Language vitality: Vigorous
- Main usage: Rural communities
- Written materials: Limited but growing
- Education use: Minimal

== See also ==
- Central Sudanic language
- Ngiti language
- Nilo-Sahara languages
- Ituri conflict
