= Voiced dental and alveolar implosives =

Consonantal sound

Voiced alveolar implosive

ɗ
- IPA number: 162

Audio sample
- source · help

Encoding
- Entity (decimal): &#599;
- Unicode (hex): U+0257
- X-SAMPA: d_<
- Braille: ⠦ (braille pattern dots-236) ⠙ (braille pattern dots-145)
Image

Voiced dental implosive

ɗ̪

A voiced alveolar implosive is a type of consonantal sound, used in some spoken languages. The symbol in the International Phonetic Alphabet that represents this sound is ⟨ɗ ⟩. The IPA symbol is lowercase letter d with a rightward hook protruding from the upper right of the letter.

A voiced dental implosive may be found in the Jhangvi dialect of Punjabi, and may be represented with the addition of a dental diacritic ⟨ɗ̪⟩.

== Features ==
Features of a voiced alveolar implosive:

- Its manner of articulation is occlusive, which means it is produced by obstructing airflow in the vocal tract. Since the consonant is also oral, with no nasal outlet, it is a plosive.
- Its place of articulation is alveolar, which means it is articulated with either the tip or the blade of the tongue at the alveolar ridge, termed respectively apical and laminal.
- Its phonation is voiced, which means the vocal cords vibrate during the articulation.
- It is an oral consonant, which means that air is not allowed to escape through the nose.
- It is a median consonant, which means it is produced by directing the airstream down the midline of the tongue, rather than to the sides.
- The airstream mechanism is implosive (glottalic ingressive), which means it is produced by pulling air in by pumping the glottis downward. Since it is voiced, the glottis is not completely closed, but allows a pulmonic airstream to escape through it.

== Occurrence ==
=== Alveolar ===
Language	Word	IPA	Meaning	Notes
Cia-Cia	아티 / Adhi	[aɗi]	'Adi'	Adi is a name.
Ega	[ɗá]		'hide'	
Fula	ɗiɗi/𞤯𞤭𞤯𞤭 / ﻃِﻂِ	[ɗiɗi]	'two'	
Goemai	ḍal	[ɗal]	'to swallow'	
Hausa	ɗaiɗai / طَﯿْﻄَﯽْ	[ɗei̯ɗei̯]	'one at a time'	
Jamaican Patois	dem	[ɗem]	'them'	Allophone of /d/ in the onset of prominent syllables.
Kalabari	ḍa	[ɗà]	'father'	
Karajá	ti	[ɗi]	'bone'	
Khmer	ដប់/dáb	[ɗɑp]	'ten'	
Konso	bad	[ɓaɗ]	'to hide'	
Kwaza	deda	[ɗe'ɗa]	'snake'	Analyzed as /d/.
Mono	ku‘da	[kūɗā]	'debt'	
Ongota	[ɡaːɗa]		'dull'	
Parkari Koli	واۮۯون	[vaːɗaɭuːn]	' clouds	
Paumarí	'bo'da	[ɓoɗa]	'old'	
Serer	biɗ / ﺑِﻂْ	[biɗ]	'flower'	Contrasts /ɓ̥, ɗ̥, ʄ̊, ɓ, ɗ, ʄ/.
Sindhi	ڏر	[ɗarʊ]	'crevice'	
Shona	kudada	[kuɗaɗa]	'prideful and pompous'	
Tera	ɗana	[ɗàna]	'to talk'	
Tukang Besi	[piɗi]		'rubbish'	
Vietnamese	đuôi	[ɗuəj]	'tail'	See Vietnamese phonology.
Wadiyara Koli				Contrasts /ɓ ɗ ᶑ ʄ ɠ/.
Wambule	डि॒	[ɗi]	'name'	
Standard Zhuang	nda	[ɗa]	'set'	

=== Dental ===
Language	Word	IPA	Meaning	Notes
Iau	du9	[ɗ̪u˦]	'wild pig'	
Jhangvi dialect				

== See also ==
- Index of phonetics articles
- Voiceless alveolar implosive

== Notes ==
Place →	Labial					Coronal										Dorsal					Laryngeal			
Manner ↓	Bilabial		Labiodental		Linguolabial		Dental		Alveolar		Postalveolar		Retroflex		(Alveolo-)palatal		Velar		Uvular		Pharyngeal/epiglottal		Glottal	
Nasal	m̥	m	ɱ̊	ɱ		n̼	n̪̊	n̪	n̥	n	n̠̊	n̠	ɳ̊	ɳ	ɲ̊	ɲ	ŋ̊	ŋ	ɴ̥	ɴ				
Plosive	p	b	p̪	b̪	t̼	d̼	t̪	d̪	t	d			ʈ	ɖ	c	ɟ	k	ɡ	q	ɢ	ʡ		ʔ	
Sibilant affricate							t̪s̪	d̪z̪	ts	dz	t̠ʃ	d̠ʒ	tʂ	dʐ	tɕ	dʑ								
Non-sibilant affricate	pɸ	bβ	p̪f	b̪v			t̪θ	d̪ð	tɹ̝̊	dɹ̝	t̠ɹ̠̊˔	d̠ɹ̠˔			cç	ɟʝ	kx	ɡɣ	qχ	ɢʁ	ʡʜ	ʡʢ	ʔh	
Sibilant fricative							s̪	z̪	s	z	ʃ	ʒ	ʂ	ʐ	ɕ	ʑ								
Non-sibilant fricative	ɸ	β	f	v	θ̼	ð̼	θ	ð	θ̠	ð̠	ɹ̠̊˔	ɹ̠˔	ɻ̊˔	ɻ˔	ç	ʝ	x	ɣ	χ	ʁ	ħ	ʕ	h	ɦ
Approximant		β̞		ʋ				ð̞		ɹ		ɹ̠		ɻ		j		ɰ						˷
Tap/flap		ⱱ̟		ⱱ					ɾ̥	ɾ			ɽ̊	ɽ						ɢ̆		ʡ̆		
Trill	ʙ̥	ʙ							r̥	r		r̠	ɽ̊r̥	ɽr					ʀ̥	ʀ	ʜ	ʢ		
Lateral affricate									tɬ	dɮ			tꞎ	d𝼅	c𝼆	ɟʎ̝	k𝼄	ɡʟ̝						
Lateral fricative							ɬ̪		ɬ	ɮ			ꞎ	𝼅	𝼆	ʎ̝	𝼄	ʟ̝						
Lateral approximant								l̪	l̥	l		l̠	ɭ̊	ɭ	ʎ̥	ʎ	ʟ̥	ʟ		ʟ̠				
Lateral tap/flap									ɺ̥	ɺ			𝼈̊	𝼈		ʎ̆		ʟ̆						

		BL	LD	D	A	PA	RF	P	V	U
Implosive	Voiced	ɓ			ɗ		ᶑ	ʄ	ɠ	ʛ
Implosive	Voiceless	ɓ̥			ɗ̥		ᶑ̊	ʄ̊	ɠ̊	ʛ̥
Ejective	Stop	pʼ			tʼ		ʈʼ	cʼ	kʼ	qʼ
Ejective	Affricate		p̪fʼ	tθʼ	tsʼ	tʃʼ	tʂʼ	tɕʼ	kxʼ	qχʼ
Ejective	Fricative	ɸʼ	fʼ	θʼ	sʼ	ʃʼ	ʂʼ	ɕʼ	xʼ	χʼ
Ejective	Lateral affricate				tɬʼ			c𝼆ʼ	k𝼄ʼ	q𝼄ʼ
Ejective	Lateral fricative				ɬʼ					
Click (top: velar; bottom: uvular)	Tenuis	kʘ qʘ		kǀ qǀ	kǃ qǃ		k𝼊 q𝼊	kǂ qǂ		
Click (top: velar; bottom: uvular)	Voiced	ɡʘ ɢʘ		ɡǀ ɢǀ	ɡǃ ɢǃ		ɡ𝼊 ɢ𝼊	ɡǂ ɢǂ		
Click (top: velar; bottom: uvular)	Nasal	ŋʘ ɴʘ		ŋǀ ɴǀ	ŋǃ ɴǃ		ŋ𝼊 ɴ𝼊	ŋǂ ɴǂ	ʞ	
Click (top: velar; bottom: uvular)	Tenuis lateral				kǁ qǁ					
Click (top: velar; bottom: uvular)	Voiced lateral				ɡǁ ɢǁ					
Click (top: velar; bottom: uvular)	Nasal lateral				ŋǁ ɴǁ					
