= Voiced palatal implosive =

Consonantal sound represented by ⟨ʄ⟩ in IPA

ʄ
- IPA number: 164

Audio sample
- source · help

Encoding
- Entity (decimal): &#644;
- Unicode (hex): U+0284
- X-SAMPA: J\_<
- Braille: ⠦ (braille pattern dots-236) ⠔ (braille pattern dots-35) ⠚ (braille pattern dots-245)
Image

A voiced palatal implosive is a type of consonantal sound, used in some spoken languages. The symbol in the International Phonetic Alphabet that represents this sound is ⟨ ʄ ⟩. Typographically, the IPA symbol is a dotless lowercase letter j with a horizontal stroke that was initially created by turning the type for a lowercase letter f (the symbol for the voiced palatal stop) and a rightward hook (the diacritic for implosives). A very similar-looking letter, ⟨ ƒ ⟩ (an ⟨f⟩ with a tail), is used in Ewe for /ɸ/.

== Features ==
Features of a voiced palatal implosive:

- Its manner of articulation is occlusive, which means it is produced by obstructing airflow in the vocal tract. Since the consonant is also oral, with no nasal outlet, it is a plosive.
- Its place of articulation is palatal, which means it is articulated with the middle or back part of the tongue raised to the hard palate.
- Its phonation is voiced, which means the vocal cords vibrate during the articulation.
- It is an oral consonant, which means that air is not allowed to escape through the nose.
- It is a median consonant, which means it is produced by directing the airstream down the midline of the tongue, rather than to the sides.
- The airstream mechanism is implosive (glottalic ingressive), which means it is produced by pulling air in by pumping the glottis downward. Since it is voiced, the glottis is not completely closed, but allows a pulmonic airstream to escape through it.

== Occurrence ==
=== Palatal ===
| Language | | Word | IPA | Meaning | Notes |
|---|---|---|---|---|---|
| Fula | | jetugol | [ʄetugol] | 'to take' | |
| Konso | | japjap | [ʄapʄap] | ‘to rot/decay completely’ | |
| Serer | | ʃaar | [ʄaːɾ] | 'to have ringworm' | Written as ⟨ݖ⟩ in the Arabic script and as ⟨ʃ⟩ in Latin script. Contrasts /ɓ̥, ɗ̥, ʄ̊, ɓ, ɗ, ʄ/. |
| Somali | Maay Maay | | | | |
| Swahili | | jana | [ʄana] | 'yesterday' | In free variation with /dʒ/ |
| Saraiki | | ڄاݨݨ | [ʄä̃ːɳəɳ] | 'know' | |
| Sindhi | | ڄِڀَ | [ʄɪbʱə] | 'tongue' | |
| Tunni | | [ʄoːɡ] | | 'to stay' | |
| Wu | Fengxian | 家 (cia^{1}) | [ʄiɑ˥˧] | 'domestic' | literary reading |

=== Post-palatal ===
Voiced post-palatal or pre-velar implosive

ʄ˗

ɠ˖

Audio sample
- source · help

There is also a voiced post-palatal (or pre-velar) implosive. The International Phonetic Alphabet does not have a separate symbol for this sound, but it can be transcribed as ⟨ʄ̠⟩/⟨ʄ˗⟩ (Note: Both indicate a retracted ⟨ʄ⟩.) or ⟨ɠ̟⟩/⟨ɠ˖⟩. (Note: Both indicate an advanced ⟨ɠ⟩.)

| Language | | Word | IPA | Meaning | Notes |
|---|---|---|---|---|---|
| Ndebele | Northern | sisibekelo | [sisiβɛɠ̟ɛlɔ] | 'lid' | Velar before back vowels; 'pre-velar' before front vowels. |

== See also ==
- List of phonetics topics
- Voiceless palatal implosive

== Notes ==
| Place → | Labial | | | | | Coronal | | | | | | | | | | Dorsal | | | | | Laryngeal | | | |
| Manner ↓ | Bilabial | | Labiodental | | Linguolabial | | Dental | | Alveolar | | Postalveolar | | Retroflex | | (Alveolo-)palatal | | Velar | | Uvular | | Pharyngeal/epiglottal | | Glottal | |
|---|---|---|---|---|---|---|---|---|---|---|---|---|---|---|---|---|---|---|---|---|---|---|---|---|
| Nasal | m̥ | m | ɱ̊ | ɱ | | n̼ | n̪̊ | n̪ | n̥ | n | n̠̊ | n̠ | ɳ̊ | ɳ | ɲ̊ | ɲ | ŋ̊ | ŋ | ɴ̥ | ɴ | | | | |
| Plosive | p | b | p̪ | b̪ | t̼ | d̼ | t̪ | d̪ | t | d | | | ʈ | ɖ | c | ɟ | k | ɡ | q | ɢ | ʡ | | ʔ | |
| Sibilant affricate | | | | | | | t̪s̪ | d̪z̪ | ts | dz | t̠ʃ | d̠ʒ | tʂ | dʐ | tɕ | dʑ | | | | | | | | |
| Non-sibilant affricate | pɸ | bβ | p̪f | b̪v | | | t̪θ | d̪ð | tɹ̝̊ | dɹ̝ | t̠ɹ̠̊˔ | d̠ɹ̠˔ | | | cç | ɟʝ | kx | ɡɣ | qχ | ɢʁ | ʡʜ | ʡʢ | ʔh | |
| Sibilant fricative | | | | | | | s̪ | z̪ | s | z | ʃ | ʒ | ʂ | ʐ | ɕ | ʑ | | | | | | | | |
| Non-sibilant fricative | ɸ | β | f | v | θ̼ | ð̼ | θ | ð | θ̠ | ð̠ | ɹ̠̊˔ | ɹ̠˔ | ɻ̊˔ | ɻ˔ | ç | ʝ | x | ɣ | χ | ʁ | ħ | ʕ | h | ɦ |
| Approximant | | β̞ | | ʋ | | | | ð̞ | | ɹ | | ɹ̠ | | ɻ | | j | | ɰ | | | | | | ˷ |
| Tap/flap | | ⱱ̟ | | ⱱ | | | | | ɾ̥ | ɾ | | | ɽ̊ | ɽ | | | | | | ɢ̆ | | ʡ̆ | | |
| Trill | ʙ̥ | ʙ | | | | | | | r̥ | r | | r̠ | ɽ̊r̥ | ɽr | | | | | ʀ̥ | ʀ | ʜ | ʢ | | |
| Lateral affricate | | | | | | | | | tɬ | dɮ | | | tꞎ | d𝼅 | c𝼆 | ɟʎ̝ | k𝼄 | ɡʟ̝ | | | | | | |
| Lateral fricative | | | | | | | ɬ̪ | | ɬ | ɮ | | | ꞎ | 𝼅 | 𝼆 | ʎ̝ | 𝼄 | ʟ̝ | | | | | | |
| Lateral approximant | | | | | | | | l̪ | l̥ | l | | l̠ | ɭ̊ | ɭ | ʎ̥ | ʎ | ʟ̥ | ʟ | | ʟ̠ | | | | |
| Lateral tap/flap | | | | | | | | | ɺ̥ | ɺ | | | 𝼈̊ | 𝼈 | | ʎ̆ | | ʟ̆ | | | | | | |

| | | BL | LD | D | A | PA | RF | P | V | U |
|---|---|---|---|---|---|---|---|---|---|---|
| Implosive | Voiced | ɓ | | | ɗ | | ᶑ | ʄ | ɠ | ʛ |
| Implosive | Voiceless | ɓ̥ | | | ɗ̥ | | ᶑ̊ | ʄ̊ | ɠ̊ | ʛ̥ |
| Ejective | Stop | pʼ | | | tʼ | | ʈʼ | cʼ | kʼ | qʼ |
| Ejective | Affricate | | p̪fʼ | tθʼ | tsʼ | tʃʼ | tʂʼ | tɕʼ | kxʼ | qχʼ |
| Ejective | Fricative | ɸʼ | fʼ | θʼ | sʼ | ʃʼ | ʂʼ | ɕʼ | xʼ | χʼ |
| Ejective | Lateral affricate | | | | tɬʼ | | | c𝼆ʼ | k𝼄ʼ | q𝼄ʼ |
| Ejective | Lateral fricative | | | | ɬʼ | | | | | |
| Click (top: velar; bottom: uvular) | Tenuis | kʘ qʘ | | kǀ qǀ | kǃ qǃ | | k𝼊 q𝼊 | kǂ qǂ | | |
| Click (top: velar; bottom: uvular) | Voiced | ɡʘ ɢʘ | | ɡǀ ɢǀ | ɡǃ ɢǃ | | ɡ𝼊 ɢ𝼊 | ɡǂ ɢǂ | | |
| Click (top: velar; bottom: uvular) | Nasal | ŋʘ ɴʘ | | ŋǀ ɴǀ | ŋǃ ɴǃ | | ŋ𝼊 ɴ𝼊 | ŋǂ ɴǂ | ʞ | |
| Click (top: velar; bottom: uvular) | Tenuis lateral | | | | kǁ qǁ | | | | | |
| Click (top: velar; bottom: uvular) | Voiced lateral | | | | ɡǁ ɢǁ | | | | | |
| Click (top: velar; bottom: uvular) | Nasal lateral | | | | ŋǁ ɴǁ | | | | | |
