= Uspantek =

Uspantek, Uspantec, Uspanteco or Uspanteko may refer to:

- Uspantek people, an ethnic subgroup of the Maya
- Uspantek language, spoken by the Uspantek people
