= Ngiti language =

Central Sudanic language of DR Congo

Ngiti
- South Lendu
- Ndruna
- Native to: Congo (DRC)
- Ethnicity: Ngiti people
- Native speakers: (100,000 cited 1991)
- Language family: Nilo-Saharan?: Central Sudanic; Eastern; Lendu; Ngiti

Language codes
- ISO 639-3: niy
- Glottolog: ngit1239

Ngiti is a Central Sudanic language of the Democratic Republic of the Congo. Speakers also refer to themselves as "Southern Lendu", and in talking to outsiders, can say they speak "Kilendu". There are Ngiti communities concentrated south of Bunia.

== Phonology ==
Consonant Phonemes
		Labial	Alveolar	Retroflex	Palatal	Velar	Labial-velar	Glottal
Nasal		m	n		ɲ			
Plosive	voiced	b	d	ɖɽ	ɟ	ɡ	ɡ͡b	
Plosive	voiceless	p	t	ʈɽ	c	k	k͡p	ʔ
Plosive	prenasalised	ᵐb	ⁿd	ᶯɖɽ	ᶮɟ	ᵑɡ	ᵑ͡ᵐɡ͡b	
Implosive	voiced	ɓ		ᶑ	ʄ			
Implosive	voiceless	ɓ̥		ᶑ̥	ʄ̥			
Affricate	voiced	b͡v	d͡z					
Affricate	voiceless	p͡f	t͡s					
Fricative	voiced	v	z					
Fricative	voiceless	f	s					h
Fricative	prenasalised	ᶬv	ⁿz					
Approximant		β	l	r	j		w	

Vowel Phonemes
		Front	Back
High	+ATR	i	u
High	-ATR	ɪ	ʊ
Mid	+ATR	e	o
Mid	-ATR	ɛ	ɔ
Low		a	

== Numeral system ==
Ngiti is reported to have a base-32 number system with base-4 cycles. The usage of base-10 number system is also used. The following is a list of some Ngiti numerals in base-32.

Number	Numeral	Meaning
1	atdí	
2	ɔyɔ	
3	ɨ̀bhʉ	
4	ɨ̀fɔ	
5	imbo	
6	aza	
7	àrʉ̀bhʉ̀	8-1
8	àrʉ̀	
9	àrʉ̀gyètdi	8+1
10	ɨdrɛ	
11	otsi-vi	12-1
12	otsi	
13	otsi dɔ̀ atdí	12+1
14	otsi dɔ̀ ɔyɔ	12+2
15	ɔpɨ-vi	16-1
16	ɔpɨ	
17	ɔpɨ dɔ̀ atdí	16+1
18	ɔpɨ dɔ̀ ɔyɔ	16+2
19	àbà-vi	20-1
20	àbà	
24	àròtsí	
28	àdzòro	
32	wǎdhɨ̀	
64	ɔyɔ wǎdhɨ̀	2×32
96	ɨ̀bhʉ wǎdhɨ̀	3×32
128	ɨ̀fɔ wǎdhɨ̀	4×32
