= Vantage theory =

Model of categorization

Vantage theory (VT) is a model of categorization, primarily of color categorization, proposed by American anthropologist and linguist Robert E. MacLaury (1944–2004).

== The basics ==
VT holds that people categorize by performing a subconscious and instinctive analogy to the way they orient themselves in space-time. They plot their position with regard to the spatial coordinates of up-down, left-right and front-back (combined into a unitary body of reference) and the mobile coordinate of relative motion, as a function of time. However, a system of spatial coordinates can itself be moving, which affects judgment. MacLaury quotes Einstein's classic example of a rock dropped from a moving train: its trajectory is different for a person on the train than for someone standing by the track.

By analogy, color categorization involves combining into coherent wholes the fixed coordinates of brightness, saturation or hue with the mobile coordinates of reciprocally balanced degrees of attention, on the part of the viewer, to similarity or difference between color stimuli. Categories are constructed as vantages, i.e. points of view, and a category may consist of more than one vantage, usually two or rarely three. Two major vantage types are called dominant (which is the default vantage) and recessive: the former results from stronger attention to similarity, the latter from stronger attention to difference. For example, the COOL category in many languages may involve vantages focused in green and blue: either of those may function as dominant. Similarly, the WARM category may involve vantages focused in red and yellow.

Three types of relationship between vantages have been identified: near synonymy, coextension, and inclusion, plus the relationship of complementation obtaining between the dominant vantages of distinct categories. The relationships are found synchronically in the world's languages but also follow a diachronic sequence in that order. The process has to do with progressively greater differentiation of categories along with greater emphasis placed on difference at the expense of similarity. The relationships are idealized segments of a continuum. The most intriguing of the four is coextension, first observed in the WARM category of Uspantec (Uspanteco), a Mayan language of Guatemala. In coextension, the ranges of each of two root terms used to name a category overlap substantially, but the range of one encompasses the focus of the other.

Other important VT constructs include:

Frame: if a category involves three vantages, they are grouped into frames. In Frame I, A is dominant relative to the recessive B, while in Frame II, B is dominant to the recessive C (C is thus ultra-recessive, but this term does not apply in a framed analysis).

Viewpoint: there are four types of viewpoint (VP-1, VP-2, VP-3 and VP-4), ranging from the most engaged or subjective VP-1 to the most detached or objective VP-4. These are stop points along a cline. Two common types are the intermediate VP-2 and VP-3, while VP-1 and VP-4 are extreme cases of a continuum probably unattainable to ordinary humans in normal categorization and language use.

Stress: a notion related to viewpoint, connected with VP-2. It refers to the choice of coordinates (fixed or mobile) to which the conceptualizer attends more than to others and the degree to which this is done.

== Vantage theory and linguistics ==
It has been claimed that “no specific theory has to date been able to account for both the linguistic and anthropological data” and it is hoped that VT can do so. Although primarily a model of color categorization, VT allows for insight into matters linguistic. This also requires that the model's area of application be extended from categorization to conceptualization. Several linguistic applications of VT can be found in two special issues of Language Sciences, others are scattered in various sources or remain unpublished. The range of application includes: the semantics of color terms, issues in lexical semantics, diachronic semantics, metaphorization, points of view in reporting events, spoken discourse, the use of articles in written discourse, aspect, demonstratives, asymmetries in conceptualizing, writing systems conventions, double constructions in English (e.g. salad salad, not fruit salad), ethnic and national identity, language learning, political discourse, semantic relations between grammatical constructions, song lyrics, the category of number, time adverbials, Arabic morphology.
