= Voiced bilabial implosive =

Consonantal sound

ɓ
- IPA number: 160

Audio sample
- source · help

Encoding
- Entity (decimal): &#595;
- Unicode (hex): U+0253
- X-SAMPA: b_<
- Braille: ⠦ (braille pattern dots-236) ⠃ (braille pattern dots-12)
Image

A voiced bilabial implosive is a type of consonantal sound, used in some spoken languages. The symbol in the International Phonetic Alphabet that represents this sound is ⟨ɓ⟩.

== Features ==
Features of a voiced bilabial implosive:

- Its manner of articulation is occlusive, which means it is produced by obstructing airflow in the vocal tract. Since the consonant is also oral, with no nasal outlet, it is a plosive.
- Its place of articulation is bilabial, which means it is articulated with both lips.
- Its phonation is voiced, which means the vocal cords vibrate during the articulation.
- It is an oral consonant, which means that air is not allowed to escape through the nose.
- Because the sound is not produced with airflow over the tongue, the median–lateral dichotomy does not apply.
- The airstream mechanism is implosive (glottalic ingressive), which means it is produced by pulling air in by pumping the glottis downward. Since it is voiced, the glottis is not completely closed, but allows a pulmonic airstream to escape through it.

== Occurrence ==
Language		Word	IPA	Meaning	Notes
Akatek		p'eyp'al	[ɓejɓal]	'the walking (thing)'	
Balanta-Ganja		ɓaara?	[ɓaːra]	'heron'	Possible allophone for /b/.
Cia-Cia		bhae / 파에	[ɓaːe]	'uncooked rice'	
Ega		[ɓá]		'send away'	
English	Southern American	body	[ɓʌdi]	'body'	Possible realization of word-initial /b/. See English phonology
Fula		fulɓe 𞤆𞤵𞤤𞤩𞤫	[fulɓe]	'Fulbe person' (g.)	
Goemai		ḅas	[ɓas]	'to fetch'	
Hausa		ɓaɓewa / ݑَݑٜىٰوَا	[ɓaɓɛua]	'quarreling'	
Jamaican Patois		beat	[ɓiːt]	'beat'	Allophone of /b/ in the onset of prominent syllables.
Kalabari		ḅá	[ɓá]	'kill'	
Khmer		បារាំង / barăng	[ɓaːraŋ]	noun: 'France' adjective: 'French'	See Khmer phonology
Konso		bad	[ɓaɗ]	'to hide'	
Kwaza		bura	[ɓuɾa]	'put [the] hat on!'	
Latundê		[ˌɓa:ˈnãn]		'(they) are two'	One of the possible realisations of /p/.
Mayan	Yucatec	balam	[ɓalam]	'jaguar'	
Mam		qanbʼax	[qamɓaʂ]	'foot'	
Mono		‘balœ	[ɓálə́]	'at'	
Punjabi	Dialectal	ਬੱਕਰੀ / بکری	[ˈɓək.krɪ]	'goat'	
Paumarí		'bo'da	[ɓoɗa]	'old'	
Saraiki		ٻال	[ɓɑː.l]	'child'	
Sindhi		ٻر	[ɓaˑrʊ]	'child'	
Serer		ɓood/ ࢠࣷودْ	[ɓoːd]	'to crawl'	Contrasts /ɓ̥, ɗ̥, ʄ̊, ɓ, ɗ, ʄ/.
Southern Nambikwara		[ɓa̰h]		'ask excuse'	One of the possible realisations of /p/.
Shona		baba	[ɓàːɓá]	'father'	
Tera		ɓala	[ɓala]	'to talk'	Contrasts phonemically with palatalized implosive, /ɓʲ/.
Tukang Besi		[aɓa]		'previous'	
Vietnamese		bạn	[ɓan̪˧ˀ˨ʔ]	'you'	See Vietnamese phonology
Standard Zhuang		lajmbwn	[la̋ːɓɯ̌n]	'world'	
Zulu		ubaba	[úˈɓàːɓá]	'my father'	

== See also ==
- Index of phonetics articles
- Voiceless bilabial implosive
- B̤ē

== Notes ==
Place →	Labial					Coronal										Dorsal					Laryngeal			
Manner ↓	Bilabial		Labiodental		Linguolabial		Dental		Alveolar		Postalveolar		Retroflex		(Alveolo-)palatal		Velar		Uvular		Pharyngeal/epiglottal		Glottal	
Nasal	m̥	m	ɱ̊	ɱ		n̼	n̪̊	n̪	n̥	n	n̠̊	n̠	ɳ̊	ɳ	ɲ̊	ɲ	ŋ̊	ŋ	ɴ̥	ɴ				
Plosive	p	b	p̪	b̪	t̼	d̼	t̪	d̪	t	d			ʈ	ɖ	c	ɟ	k	ɡ	q	ɢ	ʡ		ʔ	
Sibilant affricate							t̪s̪	d̪z̪	ts	dz	t̠ʃ	d̠ʒ	tʂ	dʐ	tɕ	dʑ								
Non-sibilant affricate	pɸ	bβ	p̪f	b̪v			t̪θ	d̪ð	tɹ̝̊	dɹ̝	t̠ɹ̠̊˔	d̠ɹ̠˔			cç	ɟʝ	kx	ɡɣ	qχ	ɢʁ	ʡʜ	ʡʢ	ʔh	
Sibilant fricative							s̪	z̪	s	z	ʃ	ʒ	ʂ	ʐ	ɕ	ʑ								
Non-sibilant fricative	ɸ	β	f	v	θ̼	ð̼	θ	ð	θ̠	ð̠	ɹ̠̊˔	ɹ̠˔	ɻ̊˔	ɻ˔	ç	ʝ	x	ɣ	χ	ʁ	ħ	ʕ	h	ɦ
Approximant		β̞		ʋ				ð̞		ɹ		ɹ̠		ɻ		j		ɰ						˷
Tap/flap		ⱱ̟		ⱱ					ɾ̥	ɾ			ɽ̊	ɽ						ɢ̆		ʡ̆		
Trill	ʙ̥	ʙ							r̥	r		r̠	ɽ̊r̥	ɽr					ʀ̥	ʀ	ʜ	ʢ		
Lateral affricate									tɬ	dɮ			tꞎ	d𝼅	c𝼆	ɟʎ̝	k𝼄	ɡʟ̝						
Lateral fricative							ɬ̪		ɬ	ɮ			ꞎ	𝼅	𝼆	ʎ̝	𝼄	ʟ̝						
Lateral approximant								l̪	l̥	l		l̠	ɭ̊	ɭ	ʎ̥	ʎ	ʟ̥	ʟ		ʟ̠				
Lateral tap/flap									ɺ̥	ɺ			𝼈̊	𝼈		ʎ̆		ʟ̆						

		BL	LD	D	A	PA	RF	P	V	U
Implosive	Voiced	ɓ			ɗ		ᶑ	ʄ	ɠ	ʛ
Implosive	Voiceless	ɓ̥			ɗ̥		ᶑ̊	ʄ̊	ɠ̊	ʛ̥
Ejective	Stop	pʼ			tʼ		ʈʼ	cʼ	kʼ	qʼ
Ejective	Affricate		p̪fʼ	tθʼ	tsʼ	tʃʼ	tʂʼ	tɕʼ	kxʼ	qχʼ
Ejective	Fricative	ɸʼ	fʼ	θʼ	sʼ	ʃʼ	ʂʼ	ɕʼ	xʼ	χʼ
Ejective	Lateral affricate				tɬʼ			c𝼆ʼ	k𝼄ʼ	q𝼄ʼ
Ejective	Lateral fricative				ɬʼ					
Click (top: velar; bottom: uvular)	Tenuis	kʘ qʘ		kǀ qǀ	kǃ qǃ		k𝼊 q𝼊	kǂ qǂ		
Click (top: velar; bottom: uvular)	Voiced	ɡʘ ɢʘ		ɡǀ ɢǀ	ɡǃ ɢǃ		ɡ𝼊 ɢ𝼊	ɡǂ ɢǂ		
Click (top: velar; bottom: uvular)	Nasal	ŋʘ ɴʘ		ŋǀ ɴǀ	ŋǃ ɴǃ		ŋ𝼊 ɴ𝼊	ŋǂ ɴǂ	ʞ	
Click (top: velar; bottom: uvular)	Tenuis lateral				kǁ qǁ					
Click (top: velar; bottom: uvular)	Voiced lateral				ɡǁ ɢǁ					
Click (top: velar; bottom: uvular)	Nasal lateral				ŋǁ ɴǁ					
