= Glottal =

Glottal can mean:

- related to the glottis
- related to the vocal folds
- glottal consonant
- related to glottalization
