= Uspantek language =

Mayan language of Guatemala

Uspantek
- Uspanteko
- Tz’unun Tziij, Tz’unun Yolooj, Tz’unun Tziijb’al
- Native to: Guatemala
- Region: Quiché (department)
- Ethnicity: Uspantek
- Native speakers: 5,100 (2019 census)
- Language family: Mayan: Quichean–Mamean; Greater Quichean; Uspantek

Language codes
- ISO 639-3: usp
- Glottolog: uspa1245
- ELP: Uspanteko

Uspantek (Uspanteco, Uspanteko, Uspantec) is a Mayan language of Guatemala, closely related to Kʼicheʼ. It is spoken in the Uspantán and Playa Grande Ixcán municipios, in the Department El Quiché. It is also one of only four Mayan languages to have developed contrastive tone (the others being Yukatek, Mochoʼ and one dialect of Tzotzil). It distinguishes between vowels with high tone and vowels with low tone.

== Phonology ==
=== Consonants ===
There are 24 consonants in Uspantek including the glottal stop.

| | | Bilabial | Alveolar | Postalveolar | Palatal | Velar | | Uvular | Glottal |
| | | Bilabial | Alveolar | Postalveolar | Palatal | Plain | Palatalized | Uvular | Glottal |
|---|---|---|---|---|---|---|---|---|---|
| Nasal | | m | n | | | | | | |
| Plosive | Plain | p | t | | | k | kʲ | q | ʔ |
| Plosive | Glottalized/Implosive | pˀ~ɓ̥~ɓ | tˀ~ɗ̥ | | | kˀ~ɠ̊ | kˀʲ | qˀ~ʛ̥ | |
| Affricate | Plain | | t͡s | t͡ʃ | | | | | |
| Affricate | Glottalized | | t͡sˀ | t͡ʃˀ | | | | | |
| Fricative | | | s | ʃ | | | | χ | |
| Trill/Flap | | | r~ɾ | | | | | | |
| Approximant | | | l | | j | w | | | |

=== Vowels ===
There are 5 vowels in Uspantek and they contrast in vowel length.

| | Front | Central | Back |
|---|---|---|---|
| Close | i iː | | u uː |
| Mid | e eː | | o oː |
| Open | | a aː | |

=== Tone ===
Uspantek has two phonemic tones: high and falling (Can Pixabaj 2007:39). In writing, the high tone is represented by an acute accent mark on the vowel (ráqan 'my foot'), and the falling tone is represented by an acute accent mark on the first vowel followed by an unmarked vowel (júun 'one').

The high tone occurs in penultimate syllables when the final syllable contains a short vowel. Additionally, it occurs the following contexts (Can Pixabaj 2007).

- Most possessive forms of inalienable nouns
- Bisyllabic single morphemes, especially those with short /a/ or /i/ in the final syllable
- Intransitive verbs with the suffix -ik
- Most words with three syllables
- Loanwords

The following types of words do not have tone.

- Words with CVʼC structure do not add tone to penultimate syllables when affixes are added.
- Monosyllabic words with long vowels that have no tone do not add tone to penultimate syllables when affixes are added.

The falling tone occurs in long vowels, and in the following contexts (Can Pixabaj 2007).

- Monosyllabic words
- Final syllable of a polysyllabic word

=== Phonotactics ===
The main types of syllable structures in Uspantek are CVC, CV, and CCVC (Can Pixabaj 2007:50).

== Literature ==
- Can Pixabaj, Telma Angelina, et al. 2007. Gramática uspanteka [Jkemiik yoloj li uspanteko]. Guatemala: Cholsamaj.
- Tuyuc Sucuc, Cecilio. 2001. Vocabulario uspanteko [Cholyool Tzʼunun Kaabʼ]. Guatemala: Academia de Lenguas Mayas de Guatemala, Comunidad Lingüística Uspanteka.
- Vicente Méndez, Miguel Angel. 2007. Diccionario bilingüe uspanteko-español [Cholaj tzijbʼal li Uspanteko]. Guatemala: Cholsamaj.
