= Serer language =

Niger–Congo language spoken in Senegal and Gambia

Serer
- Seereer سࣹيرࣹيرْ
- Native to: Senegal, Gambia, Mauritania
- Ethnicity: Serer
- Native speakers: 1.9 million (2021–2022)
- Language family: Niger–Congo?: Atlantic–Congo; West Atlantic; Senegambian; Serer
- Standard forms: Seereer-Siin
- Writing system: Arabic; Latin

Official status
- Regulated by: CLAD (Centre de linguistique appliquée de Dakar)

Language codes
- ISO 639-2: srr
- ISO 639-3: srr
- Glottolog: sere1260

Serer, often broken into differing regional dialects such as Serer-Sine and Serer-Saloum, is a language of the Senegambian branch of the Niger–Congo family spoken by 1.2 million people in Senegal and 30,000 in the Gambia as of 2009. It is the principal language of the Serer people, and was the language of the early modern kingdoms of Sine, Saloum, and Baol. Serer is primarily written in the Latin alphabet.

== Classification ==
Serer is one of the Senegambian languages, which are characterized by consonant mutation. The traditional classification of Atlantic languages is that of Sapir (1971), which found that Serer was closest to Fulani. However, a widely cited misreading of the data by Wilson (1989) inadvertently exchanged Serer for Wolof. Dialects of Serer are Serer Sine (the prestige dialect), Segum, Fadyut-Palmerin, Dyegueme (Gyegem), and Niominka. They are mutually intelligible except for the Sereer spoken in some of the areas surrounding the city of Thiès.

Not all Serer people speak Serer. About 200,000 speak Cangin languages. Because the speakers are ethnically Serer, they are commonly thought to be Serer dialects. However, they are not closely related, and Serer is significantly closer to Fulani (also called Pulbe, Pulaar, or Fulbe) than it is to Cangin.

== Phonology ==
=== Consonants ===
The voiceless implosives are highly unusual sounds.

		Labial	Alveolar	Palatal	Velar	Uvular	Glottal
Nasal		m	n	ɲ	ŋ		
Plosive	voiceless	p	t	c	k	q	ʔ
Plosive	voiced	b	d	ɟ	ɡ		
Plosive	prenasal	ᵐb	ⁿd	ᶮɟ	ᵑɡ	ᶰɢ	
Implosive	voiceless	ɓ̥	ɗ̥	ʄ̊			
Implosive	voiced	ɓ	ɗ	ʄ			
Fricative		f	s		x		h
Approximant			l	j	w		ˀj
Tap			ɾ				

=== Vowels ===
	Front		Central		Back	
	short	long	short	long	short	long
Close	i	iː			u	uː
Mid	e	eː			o	oː
Open			a	aː		

== Writing system ==
Serer today is primarily written in the Latin alphabet. The Latin alphabet has been standardized in various government decrees, the latest of which was issued in 2005.

However, historically, similar to the Wolof language, its first writing system was the adaption of the Arabic script. The Arabic script is used today as well, albeit in a smaller scale, and only mostly limited to Islamic school teachers and students. The Arabic-based script of Serer was set by the government as well, between 1985 and 1990, although never adopted by a decree, as the effort by the Senegalese ministry of education was to be part of a multi-national standardization effort. The script is referred to as "Serer Ajami script" (In Serer: ajami seereer, اَجَمِ سࣹيرࣹيرْ).

=== Serer Latin alphabet ===
Serer Latin alphabet
A	B	Ɓ	C	Ƈ	D	Ɗ	E	F	G	H	I	J	K	L	M	N	Ñ	Ŋ	O	P	Ƥ	Q	R	S	T	Ƭ	U	W	X	Y	Ƴ	ʼ
a	b	ɓ	c	ƈ	d	ɗ	e	f	g	h	i	j	k	l	m	n	ñ	ŋ	o	p	ƥ	q	r	s	t	ƭ	u	w	x	y	ƴ	ʼ
Serer Ajami Script Equivalent
‌ اَ / ◌َ	ب	ࢠ	ݖ	ࢢ	د	ط	اࣹ / ◌ࣹ	ف	گ	ه	اِ / ◌ِ	ج	‌ک	ل	م	ن	ݧ	ݝ‌	اࣷ / ◌ࣷ	ݒ	ݕ	ق	‌ ر	س	ت	ࢣ	اُ / ◌ُ	و	خ	‌ي	ڃ	‌ ع
IPA value
a	b	ɓ	c	ʄ̊	d	ɗ	e	f	ɡ	h	i	ɟ	k	l	m	n	ɲ	ŋ	o	p	ɓ̥	q	r	s	t	ɗ̥	u	w	x	j	ˀj	ʔ

The consonant /ʄ/ does not have a distinct letter, and it is not clear how it is written.

=== Serer Ajami script ===
There are 29 letters in the Serer Ajami script. The list does not include consonants that are used exclusively in Arabic loanwords and do not occur in Serer words, nor does it include digraphs used for showing prenasalized consonants.

Serer Letters
Name	Forms				Sound represented	Latin equivalent	Example		Notes
Name	Isolated	Final	Medial	Initial	Sound represented	Latin equivalent	Serer	Latin	Notes
alif اَلِف	ا	ـا		ا	/a/	/ a	اُوݒْ اَرَابْ	oop araab	The alif has two functions: first, to be the carrier of vowel diacritic as word initial, and second to indicate long vowel "-aa".
beh بࣹهْ	ب	ـب	ـبـ	بـ	[b]	b	بَنَانَ	banaana	
peh ݒࣹهْ	ݒ	ـݒ	ـݒـ	ݒـ	[p]	p	فَاݒْ	faap	Character not found in Arabic.; Unicode U+0752
ɓeh ࢠࣹهْ	ࢠ	ـࢠ	ـࢠـ	ࢠـ	[ɓ]	ɓ	ࢠَلِگْ	ɓalig	Character not found in Arabic.; Unicode U+08A0
ƥeh ݕࣹهْ	ݕ	ـݕ	ـݕـ	ݕـ	[ƥ]	ƥ	ݕِيݕْ	ƥiiɓ	Character not found in Arabic.; Unicode U+0755
teh تࣹهْ	ت	ـت	ـتـ	تـ	[t]	t	ݧࣷوتْ	ñoot	
ceh ݖࣹهْ	ݖ	ـݖ	ـݖـ	ݖـ	[c]	c	ݖَاݖِ	caaci	Character not found in Arabic.; Unicode U+0756
jeem جࣹيمْ	ج	ـج	ـجـ	جـ	[dʒ]	j	جُعࣷوخْ	juoox	
ƴeh ڃࣹهْ	ڃ	ـڃ	ـڃـ	ڃـ	[ˀj]	ƴ	ڃࣹیوْ	ƴeew	Character not found in Arabic.; Unicode U+0683
ƈeh ࢢࣹهْ	ࢢ	ـࢢ	ـࢢـ	ࢢـ	[ʄ]	ƈ	ࢢَارْ	ƈaar	Character not found in Arabic.; Unicode U+08A2
xah خَهْ	خ	ـخ	ـخـ	خـ	[x]	x	خَارِيتْ	xaariit	
dal دَلْ	د	ـد		د	[d]	d	دࣷونَا	doonaa	
reh رࣹهْ	ر	ـر		ر	[r]	r	رِيتِ	riiti	
seen سࣹينْ	س	ـس	ـسـ	سـ	[s]	s	سُݒِتْ	supit	
ɗaah طَاهْ	ط	ـط	ـطـ	طـ	[ɗ]	ɗ	طِيسْ	ɗiis	
ƭaah ࢣَاهْ	ࢣ	ـࢣ	ـࢣـ	ࢣـ	[ɗ̥]	ƭ	وَاࢣْ	waaƭ	Character not found in Arabic.; Unicode U+08A3
ayn عَيْنْ	ع	ـع	ـعـ	عـ	/ [ʔ]	/ ʼ	اِسْرَعࣹلْ	Israel	‌ Used for writing vowel sequences, and mid-word syllables that start with vowels.
ŋoon ݝࣷونْ	ݝ	ـݝ	ـݝـ	ݝـ	[ŋ]	ŋ	ݝَتْ	ŋat	Character not found in Arabic.; Unicode U+075D
feh فࣹهْ	ف	ـف	ـفـ	فـ	[ɸ]	f	فࣷوفِ	foofi	
qaf قَفْ	ق	ـق	ـقـ	قـ	[q]	q	اَ قࣷوقْ اَلࣹ	a qooq ale	
kaf کَفْ	ک	ـک	ـکـ	کـ	[k]	k	اَکࣷيْ	akoy	
geh گࣹهْ	گ	ـگ	ـگـ	گـ	[g]	g	جࣷگࣷݧْ	jogoñ	Character not found in Arabic.
lam لَمْ	ل	ـل	ـلـ	لـ	[l]	l	لَکَسْ	lakas	
meem مࣹيمْ	م	ـم	ـمـ	مـ	[m]	m	مُکَندࣷونگّ مبَاخْ	mukandoong mbaax	Used either as an independent consonant, or as part of a digraph in prenasalized consonants.
noon نࣷونْ	ن	ـن	ـنـ	نـ	[n]	n	نࣷمْتُ نجُعَخْ	nomtu njuʼax	Used either as an independent consonant, or as part of a digraph in prenasalized consonants.
ñoon ݧࣷونْ	ݧ	ـݧ	ـݧـ	ݧـ	[ɲ]	ñ	رࣵݧِّ	ràññi	Character not found in Arabic.; Unicode U+0767
waw وَوْ	و	ـو		و	[w]	w	وَتْ ݒِندࣷوࢣْ	wat pindooƭ	The waw has two functions: first, to be a consonant with the sound /w/, and second to indicate long vowels "-oo" and "uu".
heh هࣹهْ	ه	ـه	ـهـ	هـ	[h]	h	اَبْرَهَمْ	abraham	
yeh يࣹهْ	ي	ـي	ـيـ	يـ	[j]	y	يِݒُ رِيتِ	yipu riiti	The yeh has two functions: first, to be a consonant with the sound /j/, and second to indicate long vowels "-ee" and "ii".

Prenasalized consonants are written as a digraph (combination of two consonants). While historically, there were single letter alternatives, these letters are no longer used. Prenasalized consonants are constructed using meem (م) or noon (ن) in combination with other consonants. The letter meem (م) appears in pairs with beh (ب), whereas the letter noon (ن) appears in pairs with dal (د), jeem (ج), qaf (ق), and geh (گ).

Prenasalized consonants cannot take the zero-vowel diacritic sukun (◌ْ). If they are at the end of the word and have no vowels, they will take the gemination diacritic shadda (◌ّ).

In prenasalized consonants, the first letter of the digraph, namely either meem (م) or noon (ن), is written with no diacritic. This is what distinguishes them from consonant sequences.

Some Serer-speaking authors treat these digraphs as their own independent letters.

Serer Ajami prenasalized Consonant Digraphs
Forms				Sound represented	Latin equivalent	Example		Notes
Isolated	Final	Medial	Initial	Sound represented	Latin equivalent	Wolofal	Latin	Notes
مب	ـمبّ	ـمبـ	مبـ	[ᵐb]	mb	مبُودْ	mbuud	
ند	ـندّ	ـند	ند	[ⁿd]	nd	ندَبِدْ	ndabid	
نج	ـنجّ	ـنجـ	نجـ	[ᶮɟ]	nj	نجࣹکْ	njek	
نق	ـنقّ	ـنقـ	نقـ	[ⁿq]	nq	نقࣹيخْ	nqeex	
نگ	ـنگّ	ـنگـ	نگـ	[ᵑɡ]	ng	نگُلࣷوکْ	ngulook	Different from ݝ

Serer Ajami script, like its parent system, the Arabic script, and like other Ajami scripts, is an abjad. This means that only consonants are represented with letters. Vowels are shown with diacritics. As a matter of fact, writing of diacritics, including zero-vowel (sukun) diacritic as per the orthographic are mandatory.

Arabic has 3 vowels, and thus 3 vowel diacritics. But in Serer, there are 5 vowels, and as all vowels are shown with diacritics in Serer. This means that on top of the 3 original diacritics, 2 additional ones have been created.

Vowels in Wolof are also distinguished by length, short and long. Short vowels are only shown with a diacritic. Similar to Arabic, long vowels are indicated by writing alif (ا), waw (و), or yeh (ي). But unlike Arabic, this does not mean that the vowel diacritic can be dropped. It cannot, as there 5 vowels and not 3.

- For vowel "a" (◌َ), the vowel is lengthened (aa) with an alif (ا)
- For vowels "e" or "i", the vowel is lengthened (ee, ii) with a yeh (ي).
- For vowels "o" or "u", the vowel is lengthened (oo, uu) with a waw (و).

When vowels appear at the beginning of the word, an alif (ا) is used as the carrier of the vowel. If a long vowel is at the beginning of the word, an alif, an alif (ا) is used as the carrier of the vowel, followed by either waw (و) or yeh (ي) as appropriate. The exception is when a word starts with the long vowel "Aa". Instead of two alifs (اا) being used, an alif-maddah (آ) is used.

Vowel diacritics in Serer Ajami
Sukun (Zero-vowel)	Short					Long				
Sukun (Zero-vowel)	-a	-i	-u	-e	-o	-aa	-ii	-uu	-ee	-oo
◌ْ	◌َ	◌ِ	◌ُ	◌ࣹ	◌ࣷ	◌َا	◌ِيـ / ◌ِي	◌ُو	◌ࣹيـ / ◌ࣹي	◌ࣷو

Vowel at the beginning of word
Short					Long				
A	I	U	E	O	Aa	Ii	Uu	Ee	Oo
اَ	اِ	اُ	اࣹ	اࣷ	آ	اِيـ / اِي	اُو	اࣹيـ / اࣹي	اࣷو

== Greetings ==
The following greetings and responses are spoken in most regions of Senegal that have Serer speakers.

- Nam fi'o? ('how are you doing?')
- Mexe meen ('I am here')
- Ta mbind na? ('how is the family' or more literally 'how is the house?')
- Awa maa ('they are good' or more literally 'they are there')

Spatial awareness is very important in Sereer. For example, this exchange is only for when the household in question is not nearby. Certain grammatical changes would occur if the greetings were exchanged in a home that the greeter has just entered:

- Ta mbind ne? ('how is the family/house [which is here]?')
- Awa meen ('they are good' or more literally 'they are here')

In Senegalese Sereer culture like many cultures in that region, greetings are very important. Sometimes, people will spend several minutes greeting each other.

== Sample text ==
Article 1 of the Universal Declaration of Human Rights

Translation	Latin Script	Serer Ajami Script
All human beings are born free and equal in dignity and rights. They are endowed with reason and conscience and should act towards one another in a spirit of brotherhood.	Ween we naa ñoowaa na ’adna, den fot mbogow no ke war na ’oxu refna na den ’a jega ’o ngalaat ’umti yiif ’um, le mbarin o meƭtowtaa baa mbaag ’o ñoow den fot no fog.	وࣹينْ وࣹ نَا ݧُووَا نَ اَدْنَ، دࣹنْ فࣷتْ مبࣷگࣷوْ نࣷ کࣹ وُر نَ اࣷخُ رࣹفْنَ نَ دࣹنْ اَ جࣹگَ اࣷ نگَلَاتْ اُمْتِ يِيفْ اُمْ، لࣹ مبَرِنْ اࣷ مࣹࢣࣷوْتَا بَا مبَاگْ اࣷ ݧࣷووْ دࣹنْ فࣷتْ نࣷ فࣷگْ.

== See also ==
- Cangin languages

== Bibliography ==
- Fall, Papa Oumar (2013). "The ethnolinguistic classification of Seereer in question". In Africa: Challenges of Multilingualism, Ds Altmayer, Claus / Wolff, H. Ekkehard, Peter Lang, Frankfurt Am Main, Berlin, Bern, Bruxelles, New York, Oxford: 47–60.
- McLaughlin, Fiona (1994). "Consonant mutation in Seereer-Siin". Studies in African Languages. 23: 279–313.
- McLaughlin, Fiona (2000). "Consonant mutation and reduplication in Seereer-Siin". Phonology. 17 (3): 333–363. doi:10.1017/S0952675701003955.
- McLaughlin, Fiona (2005), "Voiceless implosives in Seereer-Siin", Journal of the International Phonetic Association, 35 (2): 201–214, doi:10.1017/S0025100305002215
- Crétois, L. (1972). Dictionnaire sereer-français (différents dialects) (in French). Dakar: Centre de Linguistique Appliquée de Dakar.
- Fal, A. (1980). Les nominaux en sereer-siin: Parler de Jaxaaw (in French). Dakar: Nouvelles Editions Africaines.
- Senghor, L. S. (1994). "L'harmonie vocalique en sérère (dialecte du Dyéguème)". Journal de la Société des Linguistes (in French). 14: 17–23.
