= Implosive consonant =

Group of stop consonants involving both ingressive and egressive mechanisms

IPA: Implosive consonants

Voiced	ɓ	ɗ	ᶑ	ʄ	ɠ	ʛ
Voiceless	ɓ̥	ɗ̥	ᶑ̥	ʄ̥	ɠ̊	ʛ̥

- IPA help
- audio help
- full chart
- template

Implosive consonants are a group of stop consonants (and possibly also some affricates) with a mixed glottalic ingressive and pulmonic egressive airstream mechanism. That is, the airstream is controlled by moving the glottis downward in addition to expelling air from the lungs. Therefore, unlike the purely glottalic ejective consonants, implosives can be modified by phonation. Contrastive implosives are found in approximately 13% of the world's languages.

In the International Phonetic Alphabet, implosives are indicated by modifying the top of a letter (voiced stop) with a rightward-facing hook: bilabial ⟨ɓ⟩, alveolar ⟨ɗ ⟩, retroflex ⟨ᶑ ⟩ (this letter is 'implicit' in the IPA), palatal ⟨ ʄ ⟩, velar ⟨ɠ ⟩ and uvular ⟨ʛ ⟩.

== Articulation ==
During the occlusion of the stop, pulling the glottis downward rarefies the air in the vocal tract. The stop is then released. In languages whose implosives are particularly salient, that may result in air rushing into the mouth before it flows out again with the next vowel. To take in air sharply in that way is to implode a sound.

However, probably more typically, there is no movement of air at all, which contrasts with the burst of the pulmonary plosives. This is the case with many of the Kru languages, for example. That means that implosives are phonetically sonorants (not obstruents) as the concept of sonorant is usually defined. However, implosives can phonologically pattern as both; that is, they may be phonological sonorants or obstruents depending on the language.

George N. Clements (2002) actually proposes that implosives are phonologically neither obstruents nor sonorants.

The vast majority of implosive consonants are voiced, so the glottis is only partially closed. Because the airflow required for voicing reduces the vacuum being created in the mouth, implosives are easiest to make with a large oral cavity.

== Types ==
Implosives are most often voiced stops, occasionally voiceless stops. Individual tokens of glottalized sonorants (nasals, trills, laterals, etc.) may also be pronounced with a lowering of the glottis by some individuals, occasionally to the extent that they are noticeably implosive, but no language is known where implosion is a general characteristic of such sounds.

Attested implosive consonants (excluding secondary phonations and articulations)
	Bilabial	Dental	Alveolar	Retroflex	Palatal	Velar	Labial– velar	Uvular
Voiceless	ƥ	ƭ̪	ƭ	𝼉	ƈ	ƙ	ƙ͜ƥ	ʠ
Voiced	ɓ	ɗ̪	ɗ	ᶑ	ʄ	ɠ	ɠ͜ɓ	ʛ

A labial–alveolar implosive [d͜ɓ] has also been described. Northern Ndebele has a voiced implosive that is velar before back vowels, and pre-velar before front vowels.

There are no IPA symbols for implosive fricatives, and no confirmed cases of implosive fricatives or affricates. Implosive affricates are occasionally reported, but further investigation typically reveals that such sounds are either stops or not implosive. For example, the Swahili j has an implosive allophone, but the distinction is pulmonic affricate [d͜ʒ] vs implosive stop [ʄ]. Similarly, implosive [ɗ͜ʒ] has been reported from Roglai, but it has also been analyzed as [ʄ], and the implosive affricates reported from Gitxsan turn out to be lenis ejectives that are sometimes perceived as voiced.

=== Voiced implosives ===
The attested voiced implosive stops are the following:

- voiced bilabial implosive [ɓ]
- voiced alveolar implosive [ɗ]
- voiced retroflex implosive [ᶑ]
- voiced palatal implosive [ʄ]
- voiced velar implosive [ɠ]
- voiced uvular implosive [ʛ]
- voiced labial–velar implosive [ɡ͜ɓ]

=== Voiceless implosives ===
Consonants variously called "voiceless implosives," "implosives with glottal closure," or "reverse ejectives" involve a slightly different airstream mechanism, purely glottalic ingressive. The glottis is closed so no pulmonic airstream is possible. The IPA once dedicated the letters ⟨ƥ⟩, ⟨ƭ⟩, ⟨𝼉⟩, ⟨ƈ ⟩, ⟨ƙ⟩, ⟨ʠ ⟩ to such sounds. These were withdrawn in 1993 and replaced with a voiceless diacritic, ⟨ɓ̥⟩, ⟨ɗ̥ ⟩, ⟨ᶑ̥ ⟩, ⟨ʄ̊ ⟩, ⟨ɠ̊ ⟩, ⟨ʛ̥ ⟩, though ⟨Ƥ ƥ⟩, ⟨Ƭ ƭ⟩, ⟨Ƈ ƈ ⟩ remain in Serer orthography. Some authors disagree with the analysis implied by the IPA voiceless diacritic and retain the dedicated voiceless letters, or, occasionally, suggest transcribing them instead as ingressive ejectives ⟨pʼ↓⟩, ⟨tʼ↓⟩, ⟨ʈʼ↓⟩, ⟨cʼ↓⟩, ⟨kʼ↓⟩, ⟨qʼ↓⟩ – though the latter have apparently not been used in practice. The IPA had also suggested the possibility of a superscript left pointer, ⟨p˂⟩, ⟨t˂⟩, ⟨ʈ˂⟩, ⟨c˂⟩, ⟨k˂⟩, ⟨q˂⟩, which might also be used for fricatives, but this was not approved by the membership.

The attested voiceless implosive stops are:

- voiceless bilabial implosive [ɓ̥] or [ƥ]
- voiceless alveolar implosive [ɗ̥ ] or [ƭ]
- voiceless retroflex implosive [ᶑ̥ ] or [𝼉]
- voiceless palatal implosive [ʄ̥ ] or [ƈ ]
- voiceless velar implosive [ɠ̊ ] or [ƙ]
- voiceless uvular implosive [ʛ̥ ] or [ʠ ]
- voiceless labial–velar implosive [k͜ɓ̥] or [k͜ƥ]

== Occurrence ==
In the world's languages, the occurrence of implosives shows a strong cline from front to back points of articulation. Bilabial [ɓ] is the most common implosive. It is very rarely lacking in the inventory of languages which have implosive stops. On the other hand, implosives with a back articulation (such as velar [ɠ]) occur much less frequently; apart from a few exceptions, the presence of the velar implosive [ɠ] goes along with the presence of implosives further forward. One of the few languages with a farther back implosive (specifically the alveolar one [ɗ]), and without the bilabial implosive, is Yali, a Dani language spoken on the Indonesian side of New Guinea.

Implosives are widespread among the languages of Sub-Saharan Africa and Southeast Asia and are found in a few languages of the Amazon Basin. They are rarely reported elsewhere but occur in scattered languages such as the Mayan languages in North America, and Saraiki and Sindhi in the Indian subcontinent. They appear to be entirely absent as phonemes from Europe and northern Asia and from Australia, even from the Australian ceremonial language Damin, which uses every other possible airstream mechanism besides percussives. However, Alpher (1977) reports that the Nhangu language of Australia may actually contain implosives, though more research is needed to determine the true nature of these sounds. Implosives may occasionally occur phonetically in some European languages: For instance, in some northern dialects of Ingrian, intervocalic bilabial stops may be realised as the implosive [ɓ] or [ɓ̥].

Implosives are also occasionally found in varieties of Chinese, including Yue, Min, and Wu varieties, though none of their respective representative varieties such as Cantonese, Hokkien, Teochew, or Shanghainese possess them. In Wu Chinese, implosives appear suburban Shanghainese varieties, as well as in Yongkangese. The above examples form a three-way contrast with voiced and aspirated plosive initials (eg. /pʰ ɓ b/), much like other Wu Chinese varieties' voiced-tenuis-aspirate tripartite contrast.

Fully voiced stops are slightly implosive in a number of other languages, but this is not often described explicitly if there is no contrast with modal-voiced plosives. This situation occurs from Maidu to Thai to many Bantu languages, including Swahili.

Sindhi and Saraiki have an unusually large number of contrastive implosives, with /ɓ ᶑ ʄ ɠ/. Although Sindhi has a dental–retroflex distinction in its plosives, with /b d ɖ ɟ ɡ/, the contrast is neutralized in the implosives. A contrastive retroflex implosive /ᶑ/ may also occur in Ngad'a, a language spoken in Flores, Indonesia, and occurs in Wadiyara Koli, a language spoken in India and Pakistan which in total has /ɓ, ɗ, ᶑ, ʄ, ɠ/.

More examples can be found in the articles on individual implosives.

Voiceless implosives are quite rare, but are found in languages as varied as the Owere dialect of Igbo in Nigeria (/ƥ/ /ƭ/), Krongo in Sudan, the Uzere dialect of Isoko, the closely related Lendu and Ngiti languages in the Democratic Republic of Congo, Serer in Senegal (/ƥ ƭ ƈ/), and some dialects of the Poqomchi’ and Quiche languages in Guatemala (/ƥ ƭ/). Owere Igbo has a seven-way contrast among bilabial stops, /pʰ p ƥ bʱ b ɓ m/, and its alveolar stops are similar. The voiceless velar implosive [ƙ] occurs marginally in Uspantek and /ʠ/ occurs in Mam, Kaqchikel, and Uspantek. Lendu has been claimed to have voiceless /ƥ ƭ ƈ/, but they may actually be creaky-voiced implosives. The voiceless labial–velar implosive [ƙ͜ƥ] also may occur in Central Igbo.

Some English speakers use a voiceless velar implosive [ƙ] to imitate the "glug-glug" sound of liquid being poured from a bottle, but others use a voiced implosive [ɠ].

== Bibliography ==
- Clements, George N.; Sylvester Osu (2002). "Explosives, Implosives, and Nonexplosives: the Linguistic Function of Air Pressure Differences in Stops" ( (PDF)). Laboratory Phonology. Vol. 7. Berlin: Mouton de Gruyter. pp. 299–350. Archived from the original on 2011-07-20.
- Demolin, Didier; Ngonga-Ke-Mbembe, Hubert; Soquet, Alain (2002). "Phonetic characteristics of an unexploded palatal implosive in Hendo". Journal of the International Phonetic Association. 32 (1): 1–15. doi:10.1017/S0025100302000117. JSTOR 44526273. S2CID 143737389.
- Ladefoged, Peter; Maddieson, Ian (1996). The Sounds of the World's Languages. Oxford: Blackwell. ISBN 0-631-19815-6.
- Maddieson, Ian (1984). Patterns of sounds. Cambridge studies in speech science and communication. Cambridge: Cambridge University Press. doi:10.1017/CBO9780511753459. ISBN 978-0-521-26536-2.

Place →	Labial					Coronal										Dorsal					Laryngeal			
Manner ↓	Bilabial		Labiodental		Linguolabial		Dental		Alveolar		Postalveolar		Retroflex		(Alveolo-)palatal		Velar		Uvular		Pharyngeal/epiglottal		Glottal	
Nasal	m̥	m	ɱ̊	ɱ		n̼	n̪̊	n̪	n̥	n	n̠̊	n̠	ɳ̊	ɳ	ɲ̊	ɲ	ŋ̊	ŋ	ɴ̥	ɴ				
Plosive	p	b	p̪	b̪	t̼	d̼	t̪	d̪	t	d			ʈ	ɖ	c	ɟ	k	ɡ	q	ɢ	ʡ		ʔ	
Sibilant affricate							t̪s̪	d̪z̪	ts	dz	t̠ʃ	d̠ʒ	tʂ	dʐ	tɕ	dʑ								
Non-sibilant affricate	pɸ	bβ	p̪f	b̪v			t̪θ	d̪ð	tɹ̝̊	dɹ̝	t̠ɹ̠̊˔	d̠ɹ̠˔			cç	ɟʝ	kx	ɡɣ	qχ	ɢʁ	ʡʜ	ʡʢ	ʔh	
Sibilant fricative							s̪	z̪	s	z	ʃ	ʒ	ʂ	ʐ	ɕ	ʑ								
Non-sibilant fricative	ɸ	β	f	v	θ̼	ð̼	θ	ð	θ̠	ð̠	ɹ̠̊˔	ɹ̠˔	ɻ̊˔	ɻ˔	ç	ʝ	x	ɣ	χ	ʁ	ħ	ʕ	h	ɦ
Approximant		β̞		ʋ				ð̞		ɹ		ɹ̠		ɻ		j		ɰ						˷
Tap/flap		ⱱ̟		ⱱ					ɾ̥	ɾ			ɽ̊	ɽ						ɢ̆		ʡ̆		
Trill	ʙ̥	ʙ							r̥	r		r̠	ɽ̊r̥	ɽr					ʀ̥	ʀ	ʜ	ʢ		
Lateral affricate									tɬ	dɮ			tꞎ	d𝼅	c𝼆	ɟʎ̝	k𝼄	ɡʟ̝						
Lateral fricative							ɬ̪		ɬ	ɮ			ꞎ	𝼅	𝼆	ʎ̝	𝼄	ʟ̝						
Lateral approximant								l̪	l̥	l		l̠	ɭ̊	ɭ	ʎ̥	ʎ	ʟ̥	ʟ		ʟ̠				
Lateral tap/flap									ɺ̥	ɺ			𝼈̊	𝼈		ʎ̆		ʟ̆						

		BL	LD	D	A	PA	RF	P	V	U
Implosive	Voiced	ɓ			ɗ		ᶑ	ʄ	ɠ	ʛ
Implosive	Voiceless	ɓ̥			ɗ̥		ᶑ̊	ʄ̊	ɠ̊	ʛ̥
Ejective	Stop	pʼ			tʼ		ʈʼ	cʼ	kʼ	qʼ
Ejective	Affricate		p̪fʼ	tθʼ	tsʼ	tʃʼ	tʂʼ	tɕʼ	kxʼ	qχʼ
Ejective	Fricative	ɸʼ	fʼ	θʼ	sʼ	ʃʼ	ʂʼ	ɕʼ	xʼ	χʼ
Ejective	Lateral affricate				tɬʼ			c𝼆ʼ	k𝼄ʼ	q𝼄ʼ
Ejective	Lateral fricative				ɬʼ					
Click (top: velar; bottom: uvular)	Tenuis	kʘ qʘ		kǀ qǀ	kǃ qǃ		k𝼊 q𝼊	kǂ qǂ		
Click (top: velar; bottom: uvular)	Voiced	ɡʘ ɢʘ		ɡǀ ɢǀ	ɡǃ ɢǃ		ɡ𝼊 ɢ𝼊	ɡǂ ɢǂ		
Click (top: velar; bottom: uvular)	Nasal	ŋʘ ɴʘ		ŋǀ ɴǀ	ŋǃ ɴǃ		ŋ𝼊 ɴ𝼊	ŋǂ ɴǂ	ʞ	
Click (top: velar; bottom: uvular)	Tenuis lateral				kǁ qǁ					
Click (top: velar; bottom: uvular)	Voiced lateral				ɡǁ ɢǁ					
Click (top: velar; bottom: uvular)	Nasal lateral				ŋǁ ɴǁ					
