= Uspantek people =

Maya people of Guatemalas

Uspantek
Total population
- 4,909

Regions with significant populations

Languages
- Uspantek, Spanish

Religion
- Catholic, Evangelicalist, Maya religion

Related ethnic groups
- Kʼicheʼ

The Uspantek (Uspantecos, Uspantekos) are a Maya people in Guatemala, principally located in the municipality of Uspantán. The Uspantek language is a K’ichean-Mamean language, like Kʼicheʼ.
