= Occlusive =

Consonant sound

In phonetics, an occlusive, sometimes known as a stop, is a consonant sound produced by occluding (i.e. blocking) airflow in the vocal tract, but not necessarily in the nasal tract. The duration of the block is the occlusion of the consonant; the end of the block is the release or release burst of the consonant. This set of sounds contrasts with continuants. As a distinctive feature, occlusives are denoted as [−cont].

An occlusive may refer to one or more of the following, depending on the author:

- Plosives, also known as oral stops or often just stops, are oral occlusives, where the occlusion of the vocal tract stops all airflow—oral and nasal. Examples in English are voiced [b, d, ɡ] and voiceless [p, t, k].
- Nasals, also known as nasal stops, are nasal occlusives, where occlusion of the vocal tract shifts the airflow to the nasal tract. Examples in English are [m, n, ŋ].
- Affricates are partial occlusives. Typically stops and affricates are contrasted, but affricates are also described as stops with fricative release, contrasting with simple stops (= plosives). Examples in English are [tʃ, dʒ].
- Implosives, in which the airstream differs from typical stops and affricates (no examples in English). The airstream mechanism for implosives is both glottalic ingressive and pulmonic egressive, whereas for typical stops and affricates it is only pulmonic egressive.
- Ejectives, with yet another airstream (no examples in English). The airstream mechanism for ejectives is glottalic egressive.
- Click consonants, such as the exclamation tsk! tsk! made when expressing reproach (often humorously) or pity, are double occlusives with yet a fourth airstream mechanism. They may be oral occlusives, nasals, affricates, or ejective. The airstream mechanism for clicks is lingual egressive.

Oral occlusive may mean any of the above apart from nasal occlusives, but typically means stop/plosive. Nasal occlusive may be used to distinguish the simple nasal sounds from other nasal consonants.

The terms 'stop' and 'occlusive' are used inconsistently in the literature. They may be synonyms, or they may distinguish nasality as here. However, some authors use them in the opposite sense to here, with 'stop' being the generic term (oral stop, nasal stop), and 'occlusive' being restricted to oral consonants. Ladefoged and Maddieson (1996) prefer to distinguish 'stop' from 'nasal'. They say,

Note that what we call simply nasals are called nasal stops by some linguists. We avoid this phrase, preferring to reserve the term 'stop' for sounds in which there is a complete interruption of airflow.

Compare obstruents, a class of speech sounds which includes oral stops and affricates as well as fricatives, but excludes nasals, and contrasts with sonorants.

== Common occlusives ==
All languages in the world have occlusives and most have at least the voiceless stops [p, t, k] and the nasals [n, m]. However, there are exceptions.

Colloquial Samoan lacks the coronals [t] and [n], and several North American languages, such as the northern Iroquoian languages, lack the labials [p] and [m]. In fact, the labial plosive is the least stable of the voiceless stops in the languages of the world, as the unconditioned sound change [p] → [f] (→ [h] → Ø) is quite common in unrelated languages, having occurred in the history of Classical Japanese, Classical Arabic and Proto-Celtic, for instance.

Some of the Chimakuan, Salishan, and Wakashan languages near Puget Sound lack nasal occlusives [m] and [n], as does the Rotokas language of Papua New Guinea. In some African and South American languages, nasal occlusives occur only in the environment of nasal vowels and so are not distinctive.

Formal Samoan has the nasal phonemes /n, ŋ/ and alveolar /t/, but only one word with velar /k/; colloquial Samoan conflates these to [ŋ, k]. The Hawaiian of Niʻihau has [t] for /k/ to a greater extent than Standard Hawaiian, but neither distinguishes /k/ from /t/ phonemically. It may be more accurate to say that Hawaiian and colloquial Samoan do not distinguish velar and coronal stops than to say they lack one or the other.

Yanyuwa distinguishes nasals and plosives in seven places of articulation: /m n̪ n ṉ ɳ ŋ̟ ŋ̠/ and /b d̪ d ḏ ɖ ɡ̟ ɡ̠/, which is the most out of all languages. However, the language does not have voiceless plosives.
