= Oral consonant =

Consonant sound in speech

An oral consonant is a consonant sound in speech that is made by allowing air to escape from the mouth, as opposed to the nose, as in a nasal consonant. To create an intended oral consonant sound, the entire mouth plays a role in modifying the air's passageway. This rapid modification of the air passageway using the tongue and lips makes changes to the waveform of the sound by compressing and expanding the air. In addition to the nose and mouth, the vocal cords and lungs also make a contribution to producing speech by controlling the volume (amplitude) and pitch (frequency) of the sound. The use of the vocal cords will also determine whether the consonant is voiced or voiceless. Most consonants are oral, such as, for example [p], [w], [v] and [x]. The others are nasal, such as the nasal occlusives [m] or [n].

Before there appeared the consonantal opposition nasal/oral, consonant was distinguished from vowel as closed tract from open tract. Once the nasal consonant has been opposed to the oral as presence to absence of the open tract, the contrast consonant/vowel is revalued as presence vs. absence of a closed tract.

== See also ==
- Nasal consonant
- Manner of articulation
- List of phonetics topics
