= Manner of articulation =

Configuration and interaction of the articulators when making a speech sound

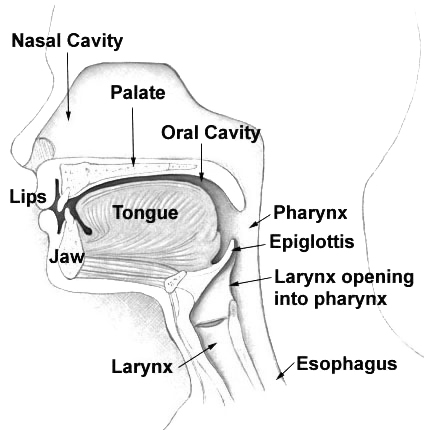
Human vocal tract

Articulation visualized by real-time MRI.

In articulatory phonetics, the manner of articulation is the configuration and interaction of the articulators (speech organs such as the tongue, lips, and palate) when making a speech sound. The primary parameters of manner are stricture (degree of constriction) – that is, how closely the speech organs approach one another – and the resulting airflow. Manner is paired with place of articulation and phonation in defining consonants.

The concept of manner is mainly used in the discussion of consonants, although the movement of the articulators will also greatly alter the resonant properties of the vocal tract, thereby changing the formant structure of speech sounds that is crucial for the identification of vowel of articulation. Often nasality and laterality are included in manner, but some phoneticians, such as Peter Ladefoged, consider them to be independent.

== Broad classifications ==
Euler diagram showing a typical classification of sounds (in IPA) and their manners of articulation and phonological features

Manners of articulation with substantial obstruction of the airflow (stops, fricatives, affricates) are called obstruents. These are prototypically voiceless, but voiced obstruents are also extremely common. Manners without such obstruction (nasals, liquids, approximants, and also vowels) are called sonorants because they are nearly always voiced. Voiceless sonorants are uncommon, but are found in Welsh and Classical Greek (the spelling ⟨rh⟩), in Standard Tibetan (the ⟨lh⟩ of Lhasa), and the ⟨wh⟩ in those dialects of English that distinguish which from witch.

Sonorants may also be called resonants, and some linguists prefer that term, restricting the word 'sonorant' to non-vocoid resonants (that is, nasals and liquids, but not vowels or semi-vowels). Another common distinction is between occlusives (stops, nasals and affricates) and continuants (all else).

== Stricture ==
From greatest to least stricture, speech sounds may be classified along a cline as stop consonants (with occlusion, or blocked airflow), fricative consonants (with partially blocked and therefore strongly turbulent airflow), approximants (with only slight turbulence), tense vowels, and finally lax vowels (with full unimpeded airflow). Affricates often behave as if they were intermediate between stops and fricatives, but phonetically they are sequences of a stop and fricative.

Over time, sounds in a language may move along the cline toward less stricture in a process called lenition or towards more stricture in a process called fortition.

== Other parameters ==
Sibilants are distinguished from other fricatives by the shape of the tongue and how the airflow is directed over the teeth. Fricatives at coronal places of articulation may be sibilant or non-sibilant, sibilants being the more common.

Flaps (also called taps) are similar to very brief stops. However, their articulation and behavior are distinct enough to be considered a separate manner, rather than just length. The main articulatory difference between flaps and stops is that, due to the greater length of stops compared to flaps, a build-up of air pressure occurs behind a stop which does not occur behind a flap. This means that when the stop is released, there is a burst of air as the pressure is relieved, while for flaps there is no such burst.

Trills involve the vibration of one of the speech organs. Since trilling is a separate parameter from stricture, the two may be combined. Increasing the stricture of a typical trill results in a trilled fricative. Trilled affricates are also known.

Nasal airflow may be added as an independent parameter to any speech sound. It is most commonly found in nasal occlusives and nasal vowels, but nasalized fricatives, taps, and approximants are also found. When a sound is not nasal, it is called oral.

Laterality is the release of airflow at the side of the tongue. This can be combined with other manners, resulting in lateral approximants (such as the pronunciation of the letter L in the English word "let"), lateral flaps, and lateral fricatives and affricates.

== Individual manners ==
- Plosive, often called stop, is an oral occlusive, where there is occlusion (blocking) of the oral vocal tract, and no nasal air flow, so the air flow stops completely. Examples include English /p t k/ (voiceless) and /b d ɡ/ (voiced). If the consonant is voiced, the voicing is the only sound made during occlusion; if it is voiceless, a stop is completely silent. What one hears as a /p/ or /k/ is the effect that the onset of the occlusion has on the preceding vowel, as well as the release burst and its effect on the following vowel. The shape and position of the tongue (the place of articulation) determine the resonant cavity that gives different stops their characteristic sounds. All languages have stops.
- Nasal, a nasal occlusive, where there is occlusion of the oral tract, but air passes through the nose. The shape and position of the tongue determine the resonant cavity that gives different nasals their characteristic sounds. Examples include English /m, n/. Nearly all languages have nasals, with only a handful of exceptions.
- Fricative, in older literature also called spirant, where there is continuous frication (turbulent and noisy airflow) at the place of articulation. Examples include English /f, s/ (voiceless), /v, z/ (voiced), etc. Most languages have fricatives, though many have only an /s/. However, the Indigenous Australian languages are almost completely devoid of fricatives of any kind.
  - Sibilants are a type of fricative where the airflow creates a high-pitched and very distinctive sound. Fricatives at coronal (front of tongue) places of articulation are usually, though not always, sibilants. English sibilants include /s/ and /z/.
  - Lateral fricatives are a rare type of fricative, where the frication occurs on one or both sides of the edge of the tongue. The ⟨ll⟩ of Welsh and the ⟨hl⟩ of Zulu are lateral fricatives.
- Affricate, which begins like a stop, but this releases into a fricative rather than having a separate release of its own. The English letters ⟨ch⟩ [t͡ʃ] and ⟨j⟩ [d͡ʒ] represent affricates. Affricates are quite common around the world, though less common than fricatives.
- Vibrant, where there are one or more brief occlusions, are a class of consonants that comprises trills and flaps.
  - Flap, often called a tap, is a momentary closure of the oral cavity. The ⟨tt⟩ of utter and the ⟨dd⟩ of udder are usually pronounced as a flap [ɾ] in North American and Australian English. Many linguists distinguish taps from flaps, but there is no consensus on what the difference might be. No language relies on such a difference. There are also lateral flaps.
  - Trill, in which the articulator (usually the tip of the tongue) is held in place, and the airstream causes it to vibrate. The double ⟨r⟩ of Spanish perro is a trill.
- Approximant, where there is very little obstruction. Examples include English /w/ and /ɹ/.
  - Semivowel, sometimes called a glide, is a type of approximant, pronounced similar to a vowel but with the tongue closer to the roof of the mouth, thus having some stricture (where vowels have none), though not enough to produce turbulent airflow. In English, /w/ is the semivowel equivalent of the vowel /u/, and /j/ (written as ⟨y⟩) is the semivowel equivalent of the vowel /i/ in this usage. Other descriptions use semivowel for vowel-like sounds that are not syllabic, but do not have the increased stricture of approximants. These are found as elements in diphthongs. The word may also be used to cover both concepts. The term glide is newer than semivowel, being used to indicate an essential quality of sounds such as /w/ and /j/, which is the movement (or glide) from their initial position (/u/ and /i/, respectively) to a following vowel.
  - Lateral approximants, usually shortened to lateral, are a type of approximant that involve airflow through the sides of the tongue. English /l/ is a lateral. Together with the rhotics (r-like sounds), which have similar behavior in many languages, these form a class of consonant called liquids.

== Other airstream initiations ==
All of these manners of articulation are pronounced with an airstream mechanism called pulmonic egressive, meaning that the air flows outward, and is powered by the lungs (actually the ribs and diaphragm). Other airstream mechanisms are possible. Sounds that rely on some of these include:

- Ejectives, which are glottalic egressive. That is, the airstream is powered by an upward movement of the glottis rather than by the lungs or diaphragm. Stops, affricates, and occasionally fricatives may occur as ejectives. All ejectives are voiceless, or at least transition from voiced to voiceless.
- Implosives, which are glottalic ingressive. Here the glottis moves downward, but the lungs may be used simultaneously (to provide voicing), and in some languages no air may actually flow into the mouth. Implosive stops are not uncommon, but implosive affricates and fricatives are rare. Voiceless implosives are also rare.
- Clicks, which are lingual ingressive. Here the back of the tongue is used to create a vacuum in the mouth, causing air to rush in when the forward occlusion (tongue or lips) is released. Clicks may be oral or nasal, stop or affricate, median or lateral, voiced or voiceless. They are extremely rare in normal words outside Southern Africa. However, English has a click in its "tsk tsk" (or "tut tut") sound, and another is often used to say "giddy up" to a horse.
- Percussives are generated by striking one organ against another. No standalone percussive occurs in any language, but alveolar clicks may have a sublingual percussive release in Sandawe, where after the click is pronounced, the tongue strikes the floor of the mouth.
- Combinations of these, in some analyses, in a single consonant: linguo-pulmonic and linguo-glottalic (ejective) consonants, which are clicks released into either a pulmonic or ejective stop/fricative.

== See also ==
- Airstream mechanism
- Articulatory phonetics
- Basis of articulation
- Diction
- Human voice
- Index of phonetics articles
- Nonexplosive stop
- Phonation
- Place of articulation
- Relative articulation
- Source–filter model of speech production
- Vocal tract

== Bibliography ==
- Ladefoged, Peter; Maddieson, Ian (1996). The Sounds of the World's Languages. Oxford: Blackwell. ISBN 0-631-19814-8.

Place →	Labial					Coronal										Dorsal					Laryngeal			
Manner ↓	Bilabial		Labiodental		Linguolabial		Dental		Alveolar		Postalveolar		Retroflex		(Alveolo-)palatal		Velar		Uvular		Pharyngeal/epiglottal		Glottal	
Nasal	m̥	m	ɱ̊	ɱ		n̼	n̪̊	n̪	n̥	n	n̠̊	n̠	ɳ̊	ɳ	ɲ̊	ɲ	ŋ̊	ŋ	ɴ̥	ɴ				
Plosive	p	b	p̪	b̪	t̼	d̼	t̪	d̪	t	d			ʈ	ɖ	c	ɟ	k	ɡ	q	ɢ	ʡ		ʔ	
Sibilant affricate							t̪s̪	d̪z̪	ts	dz	t̠ʃ	d̠ʒ	tʂ	dʐ	tɕ	dʑ								
Non-sibilant affricate	pɸ	bβ	p̪f	b̪v			t̪θ	d̪ð	tɹ̝̊	dɹ̝	t̠ɹ̠̊˔	d̠ɹ̠˔			cç	ɟʝ	kx	ɡɣ	qχ	ɢʁ	ʡʜ	ʡʢ	ʔh	
Sibilant fricative							s̪	z̪	s	z	ʃ	ʒ	ʂ	ʐ	ɕ	ʑ								
Non-sibilant fricative	ɸ	β	f	v	θ̼	ð̼	θ	ð	θ̠	ð̠	ɹ̠̊˔	ɹ̠˔	ɻ̊˔	ɻ˔	ç	ʝ	x	ɣ	χ	ʁ	ħ	ʕ	h	ɦ
Approximant		β̞		ʋ				ð̞		ɹ		ɹ̠		ɻ		j		ɰ						˷
Tap/flap		ⱱ̟		ⱱ					ɾ̥	ɾ			ɽ̊	ɽ						ɢ̆		ʡ̆		
Trill	ʙ̥	ʙ							r̥	r		r̠	ɽ̊r̥	ɽr					ʀ̥	ʀ	ʜ	ʢ		
Lateral affricate									tɬ	dɮ			tꞎ	d𝼅	c𝼆	ɟʎ̝	k𝼄	ɡʟ̝						
Lateral fricative							ɬ̪		ɬ	ɮ			ꞎ	𝼅	𝼆	ʎ̝	𝼄	ʟ̝						
Lateral approximant								l̪	l̥	l		l̠	ɭ̊	ɭ	ʎ̥	ʎ	ʟ̥	ʟ		ʟ̠				
Lateral tap/flap									ɺ̥	ɺ			𝼈̊	𝼈		ʎ̆		ʟ̆						

		BL	LD	D	A	PA	RF	P	V	U
Implosive	Voiced	ɓ			ɗ		ᶑ	ʄ	ɠ	ʛ
Implosive	Voiceless	ɓ̥			ɗ̥		ᶑ̊	ʄ̊	ɠ̊	ʛ̥
Ejective	Stop	pʼ			tʼ		ʈʼ	cʼ	kʼ	qʼ
Ejective	Affricate		p̪fʼ	tθʼ	tsʼ	tʃʼ	tʂʼ	tɕʼ	kxʼ	qχʼ
Ejective	Fricative	ɸʼ	fʼ	θʼ	sʼ	ʃʼ	ʂʼ	ɕʼ	xʼ	χʼ
Ejective	Lateral affricate				tɬʼ			c𝼆ʼ	k𝼄ʼ	q𝼄ʼ
Ejective	Lateral fricative				ɬʼ					
Click (top: velar; bottom: uvular)	Tenuis	kʘ qʘ		kǀ qǀ	kǃ qǃ		k𝼊 q𝼊	kǂ qǂ		
Click (top: velar; bottom: uvular)	Voiced	ɡʘ ɢʘ		ɡǀ ɢǀ	ɡǃ ɢǃ		ɡ𝼊 ɢ𝼊	ɡǂ ɢǂ		
Click (top: velar; bottom: uvular)	Nasal	ŋʘ ɴʘ		ŋǀ ɴǀ	ŋǃ ɴǃ		ŋ𝼊 ɴ𝼊	ŋǂ ɴǂ	ʞ	
Click (top: velar; bottom: uvular)	Tenuis lateral				kǁ qǁ					
Click (top: velar; bottom: uvular)	Voiced lateral				ɡǁ ɢǁ					
Click (top: velar; bottom: uvular)	Nasal lateral				ŋǁ ɴǁ					
