= Glottis =

Opening between the vocal folds

Identifiers
- MeSH: D005931
- TA98: A06.2.09.012
- TA2: 3197
- FMA: 55414

In humans the glottis (pl.: glottises or glottides) is the middle region of the larynx, where the vocal cords are located. Within this region is the opening between the vocal cords (the rima glottidis). The glottis is crucial in producing sound from the vocal cords. In the bichir, an early lunged fish, the glottis is a slit shaped opening into the oesophagus. In many reptiles air can be passed across a partially closed glottis to produce a hissing sound. In snakes the glottis is found behind the tongue but can be extended out the side of the mouth while eating large prey.

== Etymology ==
From Ancient Greek γλωττίς (glōttís), derived from γλῶττα (glôtta), variant of γλῶσσα (glôssa, "tongue").

== Function in humans ==
=== Phonation ===
As the vocal cords vibrate, the resulting vibration produces a "buzzing" quality to the speech, called voice or voicing or pronunciation.

Sound production that involves moving the vocal cords close together is called glottal. English has a voiceless glottal transition spelled "h". This sound is produced by keeping the vocal cords spread somewhat, resulting in non-turbulent airflow through the glottis. In many accents of English the glottal stop (made by pressing the cords together) is used as a variant allophone of the phoneme /t/ (and in some dialects, occasionally of /k/ and /p/); in some languages, this sound is a phoneme of its own.

Skilled players of the Australian didgeridoo restrict their glottal opening in order to produce the full range of timbres available on the instrument.

The vibration produced is an essential component of voiced consonants as well as vowels. If the vocal cords are drawn apart, air flows between them causing no vibration, as in the production of voiceless consonants.

The glottis is also important in the Valsalva maneuver.

- Voiced consonants include /v/, /z/, /ʒ/, /d͡ʒ/, /ð/, /b/, /d/, /ɡ/, /w/.
- Voiceless consonants include /f/, /s/, /ʃ/, /t͡ʃ/, /θ/, /p/, /t/, /k/, /ʍ/, and /h/.
