= Usenet ASCII-IPA transcription =

System for representing the International Phonetic Alphabet in ASCII format

ASCII-IPA or erkIPA is a transliteration system used to represent the International Phonetic Alphabet (IPA) in ASCII, in order to allow typewriting IPA symbols with a regular keyboard. It was developed for Usenet, notably the newsgroups sci.lang and alt.usage.english. It is sometimes called Kirshenbaum notation or even Kirshenbaum /ˈkɜːrʃənbɔːm/, after Evan Kirshenbaum, who led the collaboration that created it, and the Kirshenbaum specification that defines it. The eSpeak open source software speech synthesizer uses this ASCII-IPA scheme.

== Comparison of Usenet ASCII-IPA with X-SAMPA ==
ASCII-IPA uses almost all lower-case letters to represent the directly corresponding IPA character, but unlike X-SAMPA, has the notable exception of the letter 'r'. A non-comprehensive list of sounds where the two systems use different characters:

Sound	IPA	X-SAMPA	Usenet
alveolar trill	r	r	r<trl>
alveolar approximant	ɹ	r\	r
near-open front unrounded vowel	æ	{	&
open back rounded vowel	ɒ	Q	A.
open-mid central unrounded vowel	ɜ	3	V"
primary stress	ˈ	"	'
secondary stress	ˌ	%	,

== ASCII-IPA charts of consonants and vowels ==
This chart is based on information provided in the Kirshenbaum specification. It may also be helpful to compare it to the SAMPA chart or X-SAMPA chart ~ see Comparison of ASCII encodings of the International Phonetic Alphabet.

=== Consonant chart ===
ASCII-IPA chart of consonants (the paired signs are voiceless/voiced consonants)
Place of articulation →	Labial		Coronal				Dorsal				Laryngeal		Alveolar laterals
Place of articulation →	Bilabial	Labio‐ dental	Dental	Alveolar	Retro‐ flex	Palato‐ alveolar	Palatal	Velar	Uvular	Labio‐ velar	Pharyn‐ geal	Glottal	Alveolar laterals
Manner of articulation ↓	Bilabial	Labio‐ dental	Dental	Alveolar	Retro‐ flex	Palato‐ alveolar	Palatal	Velar	Uvular	Labio‐ velar	Pharyn‐ geal	Glottal	Alveolar laterals
Nasals	m	M	n[	n	n.		n^	N	n"	n<lbv>			
Stops	p b		t[ d[	t d	t. d.		c J	k g	q G	t<lbv> d<lbv>		?	
Fricatives	P B	f v	T D	s z	s. z.	S Z	C C<vcd>	x Q	X g"	w<vls> w	H H<vcd>	h<?>	s<lat> z<lat>
Approximants		r<lbd>	r[	r	r.		j	j<vel>	g"	w		h	
Laterals			l[	l	l.		l^	L					
Trills	b<trl>			r<trl>					r"				
Flaps				*	*.								*<lat>
Ejectives	p`		t[`	t`			c`	k`	q`				
Implosives	b`		d`	d`			J`	g`	G`				
Clicks	p!		t!	c! (Note: ASCII-IPA assigned ⟨c!⟩ to IPA ⟨ʗ⟩, which some people used indifferently for both alveolar ⟨ǃ⟩ and palatal ⟨ǂ⟩ clicks.)			c!	k!					l!

The IPA consonant chart, for comparison, uses many symbols that are less widely supported:

IPA: Pulmonic consonants

Place →	Labial					Coronal										Dorsal					Laryngeal			
Manner ↓	Bilabial		Labiodental		Linguolabial		Dental		Alveolar		Postalveolar		Retroflex		Palatal		Velar		Uvular		Pharyngeal/epiglottal		Glottal	
Nasal	m̥	m	ɱ̊	ɱ		n̼	n̪̊	n̪	n̥	n	n̠̊	n̠	ɳ̊	ɳ	ɲ̊	ɲ	ŋ̊	ŋ	ɴ̥	ɴ				
Plosive	p	b	p̪	b̪	t̼	d̼	t̪	d̪	t	d			ʈ	ɖ	c	ɟ	k	ɡ	q	ɢ	ʡ		ʔ	
Sibilant fricative							s̪	z̪	s	z	ʃ	ʒ	ʂ	ʐ	ɕ	ʑ								
Non-sibilant fricative	ɸ	β	f	v	θ̼	ð̼	θ	ð	θ̠	ð̠	ɹ̠̊˔	ɹ̠˔	ɻ̊˔	ɻ˔	ç	ʝ	x	ɣ	χ	ʁ	ħ	ʕ	h	ɦ
Approximant		β̞		ʋ				ð̞		ɹ		ɹ̠		ɻ		j		ɰ		ʁ̞				ʔ̞
Tap/flap		ⱱ̟		ⱱ		ɾ̼			ɾ̥	ɾ			ɽ̊	ɽ						ɢ̆		ʡ̮		
Trill	ʙ̥	ʙ							r̥	r		r̠	ɽ̊r̥	ɽr					ʀ̥	ʀ	ʜ	ʢ		
Lateral fricative							ɬ̪		ɬ	ɮ			ꞎ	𝼅	𝼆	ʎ̝	𝼄	ʟ̝						
Lateral approximant								l̪	l̥	l		l̠	ɭ̊	ɭ	ʎ̥	ʎ	ʟ̥	ʟ		ʟ̠				
Lateral tap/flap									ɺ̥	ɺ			𝼈̊	𝼈		ʎ̮		ʟ̆						

- IPA help
- audio
- full chart
- template

IPA: Non-pulmonic consonants

		BL	LD	D	A	PA	RF	P	V	U
Ejective	Stop	pʼ			tʼ		ʈʼ	cʼ	kʼ	qʼ
Ejective	Affricate		p̪fʼ	t̪θʼ	tsʼ	t̠ʃʼ	tʂʼ	tɕʼ	kxʼ	qχʼ
Ejective	Fricative	ɸʼ	fʼ	θʼ	sʼ	ʃʼ	ʂʼ	ɕʼ	xʼ	χʼ
Ejective	Lateral affricate				tɬʼ			c𝼆ʼ	k𝼄ʼ	q𝼄ʼ
Ejective	Lateral fricative				ɬʼ					
Click (top: velar; bottom: uvular)	Tenuis	kʘ qʘ		kǀ qǀ	kǃ qǃ		k𝼊 q𝼊	kǂ qǂ		
Click (top: velar; bottom: uvular)	Voiced	ɡʘ ɢʘ		ɡǀ ɢǀ	ɡǃ ɢǃ		ɡ𝼊 ɢ𝼊	ɡǂ ɢǂ		
Click (top: velar; bottom: uvular)	Nasal	ŋʘ ɴʘ		ŋǀ ɴǀ	ŋǃ ɴǃ		ŋ𝼊 ɴ𝼊	ŋǂ ɴǂ	ʞ	
Click (top: velar; bottom: uvular)	Tenuis lateral				kǁ qǁ					
Click (top: velar; bottom: uvular)	Voiced lateral				ɡǁ ɢǁ					
Click (top: velar; bottom: uvular)	Nasal lateral				ŋǁ ɴǁ					
Implosive	Voiced	ɓ			ɗ		ᶑ	ʄ	ɠ	ʛ
Implosive	Voiceless	ɓ̥			ɗ̥		ᶑ̊	ʄ̊	ɠ̊	ʛ̥

- IPA help
- audio
- full chart
- template

=== Vowel chart ===
ASCII-IPA simplified chart of vowels (the paired signs are unrounded/rounded vowels; symbols in parentheses designate vowels that exist in some oral languages, but do not have IPA signs)
	Front	Central	Back	Rhotic
Close	i y	i" u"	u- u	
Near-close	I I.		(U-) U	
Close-mid	e Y	@<umd> @.	o- o	R<umd>
Mid		@		R
Open-mid	E W	V" O"	V O	
Near-open	&	&"	(no symbols)	
Open	a a.	(a" A".)	A A.	

The IPA vowel chart, by comparison, uses many symbols that are less widely supported:

IPA: Vowels

	Front	Central	Back
Close	i y	ɨ ʉ	ɯ u
Near-close	ɪ ʏ		ʊ
Close-mid	e ø	ɘ ɵ	ɤ o
Mid	e̞ ø̞	ə	ɤ̞ o̞
Open-mid	ɛ œ	ɜ ɞ	ʌ ɔ
Near-open	æ	ɐ
Open	a ɶ	ä	ɑ ɒ

- IPA help
- audio
- full chart
- template

Legend: unrounded • rounded

==== Vowel modifiers and diacritics ====
Modifiers and diacritics follow the symbol they modify.

Modifier/diacritic	Meaning
~	Nasalized
:	Long
-	Unrounded
.	Rounded
"	Centralized
<?>	Murmured
<r>	Rhoticized

Stress is indicated by ' for primary stress, and , for secondary stress, placed before the stressed syllable.

== Background ==
The ASCII-IPA system started developing in August 1992 through a usenet group, after "being fed up with describing the sound of words by using other words". It should be usable for both phonemic and narrow phonetic transcription.

- It should be possible to represent all symbols and diacritics in the IPA.
- The previous guideline notwithstanding, it is expected that (as in the past) most use will be in transcribing English, so where tradeoffs are necessary, decisions should be made in favor of ease of representation of phonemes which are common in English.
- The representation should be readable.
- It should be possible to mechanically translate from the representation to a character set which includes IPA. The reverse would also be nice.

The developers decided to use the existing IPA alphabet, mapping each segment to a single keyboard character, and adding extra ASCII characters optionally for IPA diacritics.

An early (1993), different set in ASCII was derived from the pronunciation guide in Merriam-Webster's New Collegiate Dictionary, which uses straight letters to describe the sound.

Kirshenbaum's document, Representing IPA phonetics in ASCII, is commonly used as an example of an "IPA ASCII" system.

The eSpeak software speech synthesizer uses the ASCII-IPA scheme to represent phonemes with ASCII characters.

== Encoding ==
IETF language tags have registered fonkirsh as a variant subtag identifying text as transcribed in this convention.

== Notes and references ==
=== References ===
Place →	Labial					Coronal										Dorsal					Laryngeal			
Manner ↓	Bilabial		Labiodental		Linguolabial		Dental		Alveolar		Postalveolar		Retroflex		Palatal		Velar		Uvular		Pharyngeal/epiglottal		Glottal	
Nasal	m̥	m	ɱ̊	ɱ		n̼	n̪̊	n̪	n̥	n	n̠̊	n̠	ɳ̊	ɳ	ɲ̊	ɲ	ŋ̊	ŋ	ɴ̥	ɴ				
Plosive	p	b	p̪	b̪	t̼	d̼	t̪	d̪	t	d			ʈ	ɖ	c	ɟ	k	ɡ	q	ɢ	ʡ		ʔ	
Sibilant affricate							t̪s̪	d̪z̪	ts	dz	t̠ʃ	d̠ʒ	tʂ	dʐ	tɕ	dʑ								
Non-sibilant affricate	pɸ	bβ	p̪f	b̪v			t̪θ	d̪ð	tɹ̝̊	dɹ̝	t̠ɹ̠̊˔	d̠ɹ̠˔			cç	ɟʝ	kx	ɡɣ	qχ	ɢʁ	ʡʜ	ʡʢ	ʔh	
Sibilant fricative							s̪	z̪	s	z	ʃ	ʒ	ʂ	ʐ	ɕ	ʑ								
Non-sibilant fricative	ɸ	β	f	v	θ̼	ð̼	θ	ð	θ̠	ð̠	ɹ̠̊˔	ɹ̠˔	ɻ̊˔	ɻ˔	ç	ʝ	x	ɣ	χ	ʁ	ħ	ʕ	h	ɦ
Approximant		β̞		ʋ				ð̞		ɹ		ɹ̠		ɻ		j		ɰ		ʁ̞				ʔ̞
Tap/flap		ⱱ̟		ⱱ		ɾ̼			ɾ̥	ɾ			ɽ̊	ɽ						ɢ̆		ʡ̮		
Trill	ʙ̥	ʙ							r̥	r		r̠	ɽ̊r̥	ɽr					ʀ̥	ʀ	ʜ	ʢ		
Lateral affricate									tɬ	dɮ			tꞎ	d𝼅	c𝼆	ɟʎ̝	k𝼄	ɡʟ̝						
Lateral fricative							ɬ̪		ɬ	ɮ			ꞎ	𝼅	𝼆	ʎ̝	𝼄	ʟ̝						
Lateral approximant								l̪	l̥	l		l̠	ɭ̊	ɭ	ʎ̥	ʎ	ʟ̥	ʟ		ʟ̠				
Lateral tap/flap									ɺ̥	ɺ			𝼈̊	𝼈		ʎ̮		ʟ̆						

		BL	LD	D	A	PA	RF	P	V	U
Ejective	Stop	pʼ			tʼ		ʈʼ	cʼ	kʼ	qʼ
Ejective	Affricate		p̪fʼ	t̪θʼ	tsʼ	t̠ʃʼ	tʂʼ	tɕʼ	kxʼ	qχʼ
Ejective	Fricative	ɸʼ	fʼ	θʼ	sʼ	ʃʼ	ʂʼ	ɕʼ	xʼ	χʼ
Ejective	Lateral affricate				tɬʼ			c𝼆ʼ	k𝼄ʼ	q𝼄ʼ
Ejective	Lateral fricative				ɬʼ					
Click (top: velar; bottom: uvular)	Tenuis	kʘ qʘ		kǀ qǀ	kǃ qǃ		k𝼊 q𝼊	kǂ qǂ		
Click (top: velar; bottom: uvular)	Voiced	ɡʘ ɢʘ		ɡǀ ɢǀ	ɡǃ ɢǃ		ɡ𝼊 ɢ𝼊	ɡǂ ɢǂ		
Click (top: velar; bottom: uvular)	Nasal	ŋʘ ɴʘ		ŋǀ ɴǀ	ŋǃ ɴǃ		ŋ𝼊 ɴ𝼊	ŋǂ ɴǂ	ʞ	
Click (top: velar; bottom: uvular)	Tenuis lateral				kǁ qǁ					
Click (top: velar; bottom: uvular)	Voiced lateral				ɡǁ ɢǁ					
Click (top: velar; bottom: uvular)	Nasal lateral				ŋǁ ɴǁ					
Implosive	Voiced	ɓ			ɗ		ᶑ	ʄ	ɠ	ʛ
Implosive	Voiceless	ɓ̥			ɗ̥		ᶑ̊	ʄ̊	ɠ̊	ʛ̥
