= International Phonetic Alphabet chart =

Phonetic symbol chart

This is a chart of the International Phonetic Alphabet, a standardized system of phonetic symbols devised and maintained by the International Phonetic Association. It is not a complete list of all possible speech sounds in the world's languages, only those about which stand-alone articles exist in this encyclopedia.

== Official chart ==
The official IPA chart, revised to 2020

== Vowels ==
	Front	Central	Back
Close	i y	ɨ ʉ	ɯ u
Near-close	ɪ ʏ		ʊ
Close-mid	e ø	ɘ ɵ	ɤ o
Mid	e̞ ø̞	ə	ɤ̞ o̞
Open-mid	ɛ œ	ɜ ɞ	ʌ ɔ
Near-open	æ	ɐ
Open	a ɶ	ä	ɑ ɒ

- IPA help
- audio
- full chart
- template

Legend: unrounded • rounded

== Consonants ==
=== Pulmonic consonants ===
Place →	Labial					Coronal										Dorsal					Laryngeal			
Manner ↓	Bilabial		Labiodental		Linguolabial		Dental		Alveolar		Postalveolar		Retroflex		(Alveolo-)palatal		Velar		Uvular		Pharyngeal/epiglottal		Glottal	
Nasal	m̥	m	ɱ̊	ɱ		n̼	n̪̊	n̪	n̥	n	n̠̊	n̠	ɳ̊	ɳ	ɲ̊	ɲ	ŋ̊	ŋ	ɴ̥	ɴ				
Plosive	p	b	p̪	b̪	t̼	d̼	t̪	d̪	t	d			ʈ	ɖ	c	ɟ	k	ɡ	q	ɢ	ʡ		ʔ	
Sibilant affricate							t̪s̪	d̪z̪	ts	dz	t̠ʃ	d̠ʒ	tʂ	dʐ	tɕ	dʑ								
Non-sibilant affricate	pɸ	bβ	p̪f	b̪v			t̪θ	d̪ð	tɹ̝̊	dɹ̝	t̠ɹ̠̊˔	d̠ɹ̠˔			cç	ɟʝ	kx	ɡɣ	qχ	ɢʁ	ʡʜ	ʡʢ	ʔh	
Sibilant fricative							s̪	z̪	s	z	ʃ	ʒ	ʂ	ʐ	ɕ	ʑ								
Non-sibilant fricative	ɸ	β	f	v	θ̼	ð̼	θ	ð	θ̠	ð̠	ɹ̠̊˔	ɹ̠˔	ɻ̊˔	ɻ˔	ç	ʝ	x	ɣ	χ	ʁ	ħ	ʕ	h	ɦ
Approximant		β̞		ʋ				ð̞		ɹ		ɹ̠		ɻ		j		ɰ						˷
Tap/flap		ⱱ̟		ⱱ					ɾ̥	ɾ			ɽ̊	ɽ						ɢ̆		ʡ̆		
Trill	ʙ̥	ʙ							r̥	r		r̠	ɽ̊r̥	ɽr					ʀ̥	ʀ	ʜ	ʢ		
Lateral affricate									tɬ	dɮ			tꞎ	d𝼅	c𝼆	ɟʎ̝	k𝼄	ɡʟ̝						
Lateral fricative							ɬ̪		ɬ	ɮ			ꞎ	𝼅	𝼆	ʎ̝	𝼄	ʟ̝						
Lateral approximant								l̪	l̥	l		l̠	ɭ̊	ɭ	ʎ̥	ʎ	ʟ̥	ʟ		ʟ̠				
Lateral tap/flap									ɺ̥	ɺ			𝼈̊	𝼈		ʎ̆		ʟ̆						

- IPA help
- audio
- full chart
- template

Symbols to the right in a cell are voiced, to the left are voiceless. Shaded areas denote articulations judged impossible.

=== Non-pulmonic consonants ===
		BL	LD	D	A	PA	RF	P	V	U
Implosive	Voiced	ɓ			ɗ		ᶑ	ʄ	ɠ	ʛ
Implosive	Voiceless	ɓ̥			ɗ̥		ᶑ̊	ʄ̊	ɠ̊	ʛ̥
Ejective	Stop	pʼ			tʼ		ʈʼ	cʼ	kʼ	qʼ
Ejective	Affricate		p̪fʼ	tθʼ	tsʼ	tʃʼ	tʂʼ	tɕʼ	kxʼ	qχʼ
Ejective	Fricative	ɸʼ	fʼ	θʼ	sʼ	ʃʼ	ʂʼ	ɕʼ	xʼ	χʼ
Ejective	Lateral affricate				tɬʼ			c𝼆ʼ	k𝼄ʼ	q𝼄ʼ
Ejective	Lateral fricative				ɬʼ					
Click (top: velar; bottom: uvular)	Tenuis	kʘ qʘ		kǀ qǀ	kǃ qǃ		k𝼊 q𝼊	kǂ qǂ		
Click (top: velar; bottom: uvular)	Voiced	ɡʘ ɢʘ		ɡǀ ɢǀ	ɡǃ ɢǃ		ɡ𝼊 ɢ𝼊	ɡǂ ɢǂ		
Click (top: velar; bottom: uvular)	Nasal	ŋʘ ɴʘ		ŋǀ ɴǀ	ŋǃ ɴǃ		ŋ𝼊 ɴ𝼊	ŋǂ ɴǂ	ʞ	
Click (top: velar; bottom: uvular)	Tenuis lateral				kǁ qǁ					
Click (top: velar; bottom: uvular)	Voiced lateral				ɡǁ ɢǁ					
Click (top: velar; bottom: uvular)	Nasal lateral				ŋǁ ɴǁ					

- IPA help
- audio
- full chart
- template

Shaded areas denote articulations judged impossible.

=== Co-articulated consonants ===
Nasal
nm
Labial–alveolar
ɳm
Labial–retroflex
ŋm
Labial–velar
Plosive
tp
db
Labial–alveolar
ʈp
ɖb
Labial–retroflex
kp
ɡb
Labial–velar
qʡ
Uvular–epiglottal
qp
Labial–uvular
Fricative/approximant
ɥ̊
ɥ
Labialized palatal
ʍ
w
Labialized velar
ɧ
Sj-sound (variable)
Lateral approximant
ɫ
Velarized alveolar
Implosive
kɓ̥
ɡɓ
Labial–velar
Ejective
tpʼ
Labial–alveolar
- IPA help
- full chart
- template

=== Other consonants ===
- Voiceless bilabially post-trilled dental stop [t̪ʙ̥]
- Voiceless dentolabial fricative [f͆]
- Voiceless bidental fricative [h̪͆]
- Voiceless upper-pharyngeal plosive [ꞯ]
- Voiced upper-pharyngeal plosive [𝼂]
- Sublaminal lower-alveolar percussive [¡]

== Tones ==
Tone registers
◌̋	˥	꜒	Extra-high (top)
◌́	˦	꜓	High
◌̄	˧	꜔	Mid
◌̀	˨	꜕	Low
◌̏	˩	꜖	Extra-low (bottom)
ꜜ◌			Downstep
ꜛ◌			Upstep

Tone contours
◌̌	˩˥	꜖꜒	Rising (low to high)
◌̂	˥˩	꜒꜖	Falling (high to low)
◌᷄	˧˥	꜔꜒	High rising
	˨˦	꜕꜓	Mid rising
◌᷅	˩˧	꜖꜔	Low rising
◌᷇	˥˧	꜒꜔	High falling
	˦˨	꜓꜕	Mid falling
◌᷆	˧˩	꜔꜖	Low falling
◌᷈	˧˥˨, ˨˦˨, ˩˧˩	꜔꜒꜕, ꜕꜓꜕, ꜖꜔꜖	Rising–falling (Peaking)
◌᷉	˥˧˥, ˦˨˦, ˧˩˧	꜒꜔꜒, ꜓꜕꜓, ꜔꜖꜔	Falling–rising (Dipping)

== Auxiliary symbols ==
Diacritics
◌̥		◌̊	Voiceless	◌̤		Breathy voiced	◌̪	◌͆	Dental
◌̬			Voiced	◌̰		Creaky voiced	◌̺		Apical
◌ʰ			Aspirated	◌̼		Linguolabial	◌̻		Laminal
◌̹	◌͗	◌˒	More rounded	◌ʷ		Labialized	◌̃		Nasalized
◌̜	◌͑	◌˓	Less rounded	◌ʲ		Palatalized	◌ⁿ		Nasal release
◌̟		◌˖	Advanced	◌ˠ		Velarized	◌ˡ		Lateral release
◌̠		◌˗	Retracted	◌ˤ		Pharyngealized	◌̚		No audible release
◌̈			Centralized	◌̴		Velarized or pharyngealized	◌ᵊ		Mid central vowel release
◌̽			Mid-centralized	◌̝	◌˔	Raised	◌ᶿ		Voiceless dental fricative release
◌̩		◌̍	Syllabic	◌̞	◌˕	Lowered	◌ˣ		Voiceless velar fricative release
◌̯		◌̑	Non-syllabic	◌̘	◌꭪	Advanced tongue root	◌ʼ		Ejective
◌˞			Rhoticity	◌̙	◌꭫	Retracted tongue root	◌͡◌ ◌͜◌		Affricate or double articulation

Suprasegmentals
ˈ	Primary stress
ˌ	Secondary stress
ː	Long
ˑ	Half-long
◌̆	Extra-short
|	Minor (foot) group
‖	Major (intonation) group
.	Syllable break
‿	Linking (absence of a break)
↗︎	Global rise
↘︎	Global fall

Transcription
[ ]	Phonetic transcription
/ /	Phonemic transcription
{ }	Prosodic notation
( )	Indistinguishable utterance
⸨ ⸩	Sound obscured

== See also ==
- IPA vowel chart with audio
- IPA consonant chart with audio
- International Phonetic Alphabet chart for English dialects
- Extensions to the International Phonetic Alphabet
- Obsolete and nonstandard symbols in the International Phonetic Alphabet

Place →	Labial					Coronal										Dorsal					Laryngeal			
Manner ↓	Bilabial		Labiodental		Linguolabial		Dental		Alveolar		Postalveolar		Retroflex		(Alveolo-)palatal		Velar		Uvular		Pharyngeal/epiglottal		Glottal	
Nasal	m̥	m	ɱ̊	ɱ		n̼	n̪̊	n̪	n̥	n	n̠̊	n̠	ɳ̊	ɳ	ɲ̊	ɲ	ŋ̊	ŋ	ɴ̥	ɴ				
Plosive	p	b	p̪	b̪	t̼	d̼	t̪	d̪	t	d			ʈ	ɖ	c	ɟ	k	ɡ	q	ɢ	ʡ		ʔ	
Sibilant affricate							t̪s̪	d̪z̪	ts	dz	t̠ʃ	d̠ʒ	tʂ	dʐ	tɕ	dʑ								
Non-sibilant affricate	pɸ	bβ	p̪f	b̪v			t̪θ	d̪ð	tɹ̝̊	dɹ̝	t̠ɹ̠̊˔	d̠ɹ̠˔			cç	ɟʝ	kx	ɡɣ	qχ	ɢʁ	ʡʜ	ʡʢ	ʔh	
Sibilant fricative							s̪	z̪	s	z	ʃ	ʒ	ʂ	ʐ	ɕ	ʑ								
Non-sibilant fricative	ɸ	β	f	v	θ̼	ð̼	θ	ð	θ̠	ð̠	ɹ̠̊˔	ɹ̠˔	ɻ̊˔	ɻ˔	ç	ʝ	x	ɣ	χ	ʁ	ħ	ʕ	h	ɦ
Approximant		β̞		ʋ				ð̞		ɹ		ɹ̠		ɻ		j		ɰ						˷
Tap/flap		ⱱ̟		ⱱ					ɾ̥	ɾ			ɽ̊	ɽ						ɢ̆		ʡ̆		
Trill	ʙ̥	ʙ							r̥	r		r̠	ɽ̊r̥	ɽr					ʀ̥	ʀ	ʜ	ʢ		
Lateral affricate									tɬ	dɮ			tꞎ	d𝼅	c𝼆	ɟʎ̝	k𝼄	ɡʟ̝						
Lateral fricative							ɬ̪		ɬ	ɮ			ꞎ	𝼅	𝼆	ʎ̝	𝼄	ʟ̝						
Lateral approximant								l̪	l̥	l		l̠	ɭ̊	ɭ	ʎ̥	ʎ	ʟ̥	ʟ		ʟ̠				
Lateral tap/flap									ɺ̥	ɺ			𝼈̊	𝼈		ʎ̆		ʟ̆						

		BL	LD	D	A	PA	RF	P	V	U
Implosive	Voiced	ɓ			ɗ		ᶑ	ʄ	ɠ	ʛ
Implosive	Voiceless	ɓ̥			ɗ̥		ᶑ̊	ʄ̊	ɠ̊	ʛ̥
Ejective	Stop	pʼ			tʼ		ʈʼ	cʼ	kʼ	qʼ
Ejective	Affricate		p̪fʼ	tθʼ	tsʼ	tʃʼ	tʂʼ	tɕʼ	kxʼ	qχʼ
Ejective	Fricative	ɸʼ	fʼ	θʼ	sʼ	ʃʼ	ʂʼ	ɕʼ	xʼ	χʼ
Ejective	Lateral affricate				tɬʼ			c𝼆ʼ	k𝼄ʼ	q𝼄ʼ
Ejective	Lateral fricative				ɬʼ					
Click (top: velar; bottom: uvular)	Tenuis	kʘ qʘ		kǀ qǀ	kǃ qǃ		k𝼊 q𝼊	kǂ qǂ		
Click (top: velar; bottom: uvular)	Voiced	ɡʘ ɢʘ		ɡǀ ɢǀ	ɡǃ ɢǃ		ɡ𝼊 ɢ𝼊	ɡǂ ɢǂ		
Click (top: velar; bottom: uvular)	Nasal	ŋʘ ɴʘ		ŋǀ ɴǀ	ŋǃ ɴǃ		ŋ𝼊 ɴ𝼊	ŋǂ ɴǂ	ʞ	
Click (top: velar; bottom: uvular)	Tenuis lateral				kǁ qǁ					
Click (top: velar; bottom: uvular)	Voiced lateral				ɡǁ ɢǁ					
Click (top: velar; bottom: uvular)	Nasal lateral				ŋǁ ɴǁ					
