= Ejective consonant =

Consonantal sound

IPA: Ejective consonants

Stop	pʼ	tʼ	ʈʼ	cʼ	kʼ	qʼ
Fricative	fʼ	sʼ	ʂʼ	ɕʼ	xʼ	χʼ
Fricative	ɸʼ	θʼ	ʃʼ			
Affricate	tθʼ	tsʼ	tʂʼ	tʃʼ	kxʼ	qχʼ
Lateral		ɬʼ	tɬʼ	c𝼆ʼ	k𝼄ʼ	

- IPA help
- audio help
- full chart
- template

In phonetics, ejective consonants are usually voiceless consonants that are pronounced with a glottalic egressive airstream. In the phonology of a particular language, ejectives may contrast with aspirated, voiced and tenuis consonants. Some languages have glottalized sonorants that pattern with ejectives phonologically, and others have ejectives that pattern with implosives; this has led phonologists to posit an overarching phonological class of glottalic consonants.

== Description ==
In producing an ejective, the stylohyoid muscle and digastric muscle contract, causing the hyoid bone and the connected glottis to rise, and the forward articulation (at the velum in the case of [kʼ]) is held, raising air pressure greatly in the mouth so when the oral articulators separate, there is a dramatic burst of air. The Adam's apple may be seen moving when the sound is pronounced. In the languages in which they are more obvious, ejectives are often described as sounding like "spat" consonants, but ejectives are often quite weak. In some contexts and in some languages, they are easy to mistake for tenuis or even voiced stops. These weakly ejective articulations are sometimes called intermediates in older American linguistic literature and are notated with different phonetic symbols: ⟨C!⟩ = strongly ejective, ⟨Cʼ⟩ = weakly ejective. Strong and weak ejectives have not been found to be contrastive in any natural language.

In strict, technical terms, ejectives are glottalic egressive consonants. The most common ejective is [kʼ] even if it is more difficult to produce than other ejectives like [tʼ] or [pʼ] because the auditory distinction between [kʼ] and [k] is greater than with other ejectives and voiceless consonants of the same place of articulation. In proportion to the frequency of uvular consonants, [qʼ] is even more common, as would be expected from the very small oral cavity used to pronounce a voiceless uvular stop. [pʼ], on the other hand, is quite rare. That is the opposite pattern to what is found in the implosive consonants, in which the bilabial is common and the velar is rare.

Ejective fricatives are rare for presumably the same reason: with the air escaping from the mouth while the pressure is being raised, like inflating a leaky bicycle tire, it is harder to distinguish the resulting sound as salient as a [kʼ].

== Occurrence ==
Consonants described as ejectives occur in about 20% of the world's languages. Ejectives that contrast with pulmonic consonants occur in about 15% of languages around the world. The occurrence of ejectives often correlates to languages in mountainous regions such as the Caucasus which forms an island of ejective languages. They are also found frequently in the East African Rift and the South African Plateau (see Geography of Africa). In the Americas, they are extremely common in the North American Cordillera. They also frequently occur throughout the Andes and Maya Mountains. Elsewhere, they are rare. Phonetically, however, they are quite common, occurring even in English.

Language families that distinguish ejective consonants include:

- Afroasiatic languages, especially in the Cushitic and Omotic branches, and in some languages of the Semitic (Ethio-Semitic and Modern South Arabian) and Chadic branches (e.g. Hausa)
- All three families of the Caucasus: the Northwest Caucasian languages (Circassian, Abkhaz and Ubykh); the Northeast Caucasian languages such as Chechen and Avar; and the Kartvelian languages such as Georgian
- the Athabaskan, Siouan and Salishan families of North America along with the many diverse families of the Pacific Northwest from central California to British Columbia
- Mayan languages, as well as neighboring Lencan languages and Xincan languages
- Aymaran languages
- the southern varieties of Quechua (Qusqu-Qullaw)
- Chonan languages
- Alacalufan (Kawesqar) languages
- Gumuz, Meʼen, Tʼwampa and possibly other "Nilo-Saharan" languages
- Sandawe, Hadza, and the Khoisan families of southern Africa
- Itelmen of the Chukotko-Kamchatkan languages
- Yapese and Waima'a of the Austronesian family
- Kunigami and several Northern Ryukyuan and Yaeyama varieties of the Japonic-Ryukyuan family

According to the glottalic theory, the Proto-Indo-European language had a series of ejectives (or, in some versions, implosives), but no extant Indo-European language has retained them. (Note: The western and Northwestern Indic languages like Sindhi have implosives.) Ejectives are found today in Ossetian and some Armenian dialects only because of influence of the nearby Northeast Caucasian and/or Kartvelian language families.

It had once been predicted that ejectives and implosives would not be found in the same language but both have been found phonemically at several points of articulation in Nilo-Saharan languages (Gumuz, Me'en, and T'wampa), Mayan language (Yucatec), and the Oto-Manguean Mazahua. Nguni languages, such as Zulu have an implosive b alongside a series of allophonically ejective stops. Dahalo of Kenya, has ejectives, implosives, and click consonants.

Non-contrastively, ejectives are found in many varieties of English, usually replacing word-final fortis plosives in utterance-final or emphatic contexts.

== Types ==
Almost all ejective consonants in the world's languages are stops or affricates, and all ejective consonants are obstruents. [kʼ] is the most common ejective, and [qʼ] is common among languages with uvulars, [tʼ] less so, and [pʼ] is uncommon. Among affricates, [tsʼ], [tʃʼ], [tɬʼ] are all quite common, and [kxʼ] and [ʈʂʼ] are not unusual ([kxʼ] is particularly common among the Khoisan languages, where it is the ejective equivalent of /k/).

Attested ejective consonants (excluding ejective clicks and secondary articulations)
		Bilabial	Labio- dental	Dental	Alveolar	Labial- alveolar	Post- alveolar	Retroflex	Alveolo- palatal	Palatal	Velar	Uvular
Stop	plain	pʼ		t̪ʼ	tʼ	t͡pʼ (Note: In Ubykh; in free variation with [tʷʼ]; also found in Abkhaz in free variation with [tʷʼ].)		ʈʼ		cʼ	kʼ	qʼ
Stop	voiced										ɡ͡kʼ	ɢ͡qʼ
Affricate	plain		p̪fʼ	t̪θʼ	tsʼ		tʃʼ	ʈʂʼ	tɕʼ		kxʼ	qχʼ
Affricate	voiced				d͡tsʼ		d͡tʃʼ				ɡ͡kxʼ	ɢ͡qχʼ
Fricative		ɸʼ	fʼ	θʼ	sʼ		ʃʼ	ʂʼ	ɕʼ		xʼ	χʼ
Lateral affricate					tɬʼ					c𝼆ʼ	k𝼄ʼ	
Lateral fricative					ɬʼ							

A few languages have ejective fricatives. In some dialects of Hausa, the standard affricate [tsʼ] is a fricative [sʼ]; Ubykh (Northwest Caucasian, now extinct) had an ejective lateral fricative [ɬʼ]; and the related Kabardian also has ejective labiodental and alveolopalatal fricatives, [fʼ], [ʃʼ], and [ɬʼ]. Tlingit is an extreme case, with ejective alveolar, lateral, velar, and uvular fricatives, [sʼ], [ɬʼ], [xʼ], [xʷʼ], [χʼ], [χʷʼ]. Upper Necaxa Totonac is unusual and perhaps unique in that it has ejective fricatives (alveolar, lateral, and postalveolar [sʼ], [ʃʼ], [ɬʼ]) but lacks any ejective stop or affricate (Beck 2006). Other languages with ejective fricatives are Yuchi, which some sources analyze as having [ɸʼ], [sʼ], [ʃʼ], and [ɬʼ] (but not the analysis of the Wikipedia article), Keres dialects, with [sʼ], [ʂʼ] and [ɕʼ], and Lakota, with [sʼ], [ʃʼ], and [xʼ] . Amharic is interpreted by many as having an ejective fricative [sʼ], at least historically, but it has been also analyzed as now being a sociolinguistic variant (Takkele Taddese 1992).

An ejective retroflex stop [ʈʼ] is rare. It has been reported from Yawelmani and other Yokuts languages, Tolowa, and Gwich'in.

Because the glottal closure required to form an ejective makes voicing impossible, the allophonic voicing of ejective phonemes causes them to lose their glottalization; this occurs in Blin (modal voice) and Kabardian (creaky voice). A similar historical sound change also occurred in Veinakh and Lezgic in the Caucasus, and it has been postulated by the glottalic theory for Indo-European. Some Khoisan languages have voiced ejective stops and voiced ejective clicks; however, they actually contain mixed voicing, and the ejective release is voiceless.

Ejective trills are not attested in any language, even allophonically. An ejective [rʼ] would necessarily be voiceless, but the vibration of the trill, combined with a lack of the intense voiceless airflow of [r̥], gives an impression like that of voicing. Similarly, ejective nasals such as [mʼ, nʼ, ŋʼ] (also necessarily voiceless) are possible. (An apostrophe is commonly seen with r, l and nasals, but that is Americanist phonetic notation for a glottalized consonant and does not indicate an ejective.)

Other ejective sonorants are not known to occur. When sonorants are transcribed with an apostrophe in the literature as if they were ejective, they actually involve a different airstream mechanism: they are glottalized consonants and vowels whose glottalization partially or fully interrupts an otherwise normal voiced pulmonic airstream, somewhat like English uh-uh (either vocalic or nasal) pronounced as a single sound. Often the constriction of the larynx causes it to rise in the vocal tract, but this is individual variation and not the initiator of the airflow. Such sounds generally remain voiced.

Yeyi has a set of prenasalized ejectives, /ⁿtʼ, ᵑkʼ, ⁿtsʼ/.

== Orthography ==
In the International Phonetic Alphabet, ejectives are indicated with a "modifier letter apostrophe" ⟨ʼ⟩, as in this article. A reversed apostrophe is sometimes used to represent light aspiration, as in Armenian linguistics ⟨pʻ tʻ kʻ⟩; this usage is obsolete in the IPA. In other transcription traditions (such as many romanisations of Russian, where it is transliterating the soft sign), the apostrophe represents palatalization: ⟨pʼ⟩ = IPA ⟨pʲ⟩. In some Americanist traditions, an apostrophe indicates weak ejection and an exclamation mark strong ejection: ⟨k̓ , k!⟩. In the IPA, the distinction might be written ⟨kʼ, kʼʼ⟩, but it seems that no language distinguishes degrees of ejection. Transcriptions of the Caucasian languages often utilize combining dots above or below a letter to indicate an ejective.

In alphabets using the Latin script, an IPA-like apostrophe for ejective consonants is common. However, there are other conventions. In Hausa, the hooked letter ƙ is used for /kʼ/. In Zulu and Xhosa, whose ejection is variable between speakers, plain consonant letters are used: p t k ts tsh kr for /pʼ tʼ kʼ tsʼ tʃʼ kxʼ/. In some conventions for Haida and Hadza, double letters are used: tt kk qq ttl tts for /tʼ kʼ qʼ tɬʼ tsʼ/ (Haida) and zz jj dl gg for /tsʼ tʃʼ c𝼆ʼ kxʼ/ (Hadza).

== List ==
=== Stops ===
- bilabial ejective stop [pʼ] (in Abkhaz, Adyghe, Amharic, Archi, Chechen, Ingush, Georgian, Mingrelian, Laz, Svan, Hadza, Kabardian, Lezgian, Lakota, Nez Perce, Quechua, Tigrinya, isiXhosa, isiZulu)
  - labialized bilabial ejective stop [pʷʼ] (in Adyghe)
  - pharyngealized bilabial ejective stop [pˤʼ] (in Ubykh)
  - prenasalized bilabial ejective stop [^{m}pʼ] (in isiXhosa)
- dental ejective stop [t̪ʼ] (in Dahalo, Lakota, Tigrinya)
- alveolar ejective stop [tʼ] (in Abkhaz, Adyghe, Amharic, Archi, Avar, Bats, Chechen, Ingush, Kabardian, Georgian, Mingrelian, Laz, Svan, Gwich'in, Nez Perce, Quechua, Tlingit, isiXhosa, isiZulu)
  - labialized alveolar ejective stop [tʷʼ] (in Abkhaz, Adyghe, Ubykh, isiXhosa)
  - labial–velar ejective stop [tpʼ] (in Abkhaz, Ubykh)
  - prenasalized dental ejective stop [^{n}tʼ] (in isiXhosa)
  - prenasalized labialized alveolar ejective stop [^{n}tʼʷ] (in isiXhosa)
- retroflex ejective stop [ʈ’] (in Gwich'in)
- palatal ejective stop [cʼ] (in Bats, Hausa, Gǀui, Nez Perce, isiXhosa, isiZulu)
  - prenasalized palatal ejective stop [^{ɲ}cʼ] (in isiXhosa)
  - labialized palatal ejective stop [cʷʼ] (in isiXhosa)
  - prenasalized labialized palatal ejective stop [^{ɲ}cʷʼ] (in isiXhosa)
- velar ejective stop [kʼ] (in Abaza, Abkhaz, Adyghe, Amharic, Archi, Avar, Bats, Chechen, Ingush, Georgian, Mingrelian, Laz, Svan, Gǀui, Gwich'in, Hausa, Kabardian, Lakota, Nez Perce, Quechua, Sandawe, Tigrinya, Tlingit, isiXhosa, isiZulu)
  - palatalized velar ejective stop [kʲʼ] (in Abaza, Abkhaz, Shapsug, Ubykh)
  - labialized velar ejective stop [kʷʼ] (in Abaza, Abkhaz, Adyghe, Archi, Kabardian, Tlingit, Ubykh, isiXhosa, isiZulu)
  - prenasalized velar ejective stop [^{ŋ}kʼ] (in isiXhosa)
  - prenasalized labialized velar ejective stop [^{ŋ}kʷʼ] (in isiXhosa)
- uvular ejective stop [qʼ] (in Abaza, Abkhaz, Archi, Bats, Chechen, Ingush, Georgian, Mingrelian, Laz, Svan, Hakuchi, Nez Perce, Quechua, Tlingit)
  - palatalized uvular ejective stop [qʲʼ] (in Abaza, Abkhaz, Ubykh)
  - labialized uvular ejective stop [qʷʼ] (in Abaza, Abkhaz, Archi, Hakuchi, Tlingit, Ubykh)
  - pharyngealized uvular ejective stop [qˤʼ] (in Archi, Ubykh)
  - labialized pharyngealized uvular ejective stop [qˤʷʼ] (in Archi, Ubykh)

=== Affricates ===
- labiodental ejective affricate [p̪fʼ] (in TshiVenda and isiXhosa)
  - prenasalized labiodental ejective affricate [^{ɱ}p̪fʼ] (in isiXhosa)
- dental ejective affricate [tθʼ] (in Chipewyan, Gwich'in)
- alveolar ejective affricate [tsʼ] (in Abaza, Abkhaz, Adyghe, Amharic, Archi, Avar, Chechen, Ingush, Bats, Georgian, Mingrelian, Laz, Svan, Gǀui, Gwich'in, Hadza, Hausa, Kabardian, Sandawe, Tigrinya, Tlingit, Ubykh, isiXhosa)
  - labialized alveolar ejective affricate [t͡sʷʼ] (in Archi and isiXhosa)
  - prenasalized labialized alveolar adjective affricate [^{n}t͡sʷʼ] (in isiXhosa)
- palato-alveolar ejective affricate [tʃʼ] (in Abaza, Abkhaz, Adyghe, Amharic, Archi, Avar, Chechen, Ingush, Bats, Chipewyan, Georgian, Mingrelian, Laz, Svan, Gwich'in, Hadza, Hausa, Kabardian, Lakota, Quechua, Tigrinya, Tlingit, Ubykh, isiXhosa, isiZulu)
  - labialized palato-alveolar ejective affricate [t͡ʃʷʼ] (in Abaza, Archi, isiXhosa)
  - prenasalized labialized palato-alveolar ejective affricate [^{n̠}t͡ʃʷʼ] (in isiXhosa)
- retroflex ejective affricate [ʈ͡ʂʼ] (in Abkhaz, Adyghe, Ubykh)
- alveolo-palatal ejective affricate [t͡ɕʼ] (in Abaza, Abkhaz, Ubykh)
  - labialized alveolo-palatal ejective affricate [t͡ɕʷʼ] (in Abkhaz, Ubykh)
- palatal ejective affricate [cçʼ]
- velar ejective affricate [kxʼ] (in Hadza, Zulu)
- uvular ejective affricate [qχʼ] (in Avar, Gǀui, Lillooet)
- alveolar lateral ejective affricate [tɬʼ] (in Baslaney, Chipewyan, Dahalo, Gwich'in, Haida, Lillooet, Nez Perce, Sandawe, Tlingit, Tsez, isiXhosa)
  - labialized alveolar lateral ejective affricate [tɬʷʼ] (isiXhosa)
  - prenasalized alveolar lateral ejective affricate [^{n}tɬʼ] (isiXhosa)
  - prenasalized labialized alveolar lateral ejective affricate [^{n}tɬʷʼ] (isiXhosa)
- palatal lateral ejective affricate [c͡𝼆ʼ] (in Dahalo, Hadza)
- velar lateral ejective affricate [k͡𝼄ʼ] (in Archi, Gǀui)
  - labialized velar lateral ejective affricate [k͡𝼄ʷʼ] (in Archi)
- uvular lateral ejective affricate [q𝼄̠ʼ] (in Gǀui, ǂʼAmkoe)

=== Fricatives ===
- bilabial ejective fricative [ɸʼ]
- labiodental ejective fricative [fʼ] (in Abaza, Kabardian)
- dental ejective fricative [θʼ] (in Chiwere)
- alveolar ejective fricative [sʼ] (in Chiwere, Lakota, Shapsug, Tlingit)
- alveolar lateral ejective fricative [ɬʼ] (in Abaza, Adyghe, Kabardian, Tlingit, Ubykh)
- palato-alveolar ejective fricative [ʃʼ] (in Adyghe, Lakota)
  - labialized palato-alveolar ejective fricative [ʃʷʼ] (in Adyghe)
- retroflex ejective fricative [ʂʼ] (in Keres)
- alveolo-palatal ejective fricative [ɕʼ] (in Kabardian)
- palatal ejective fricative [çʼ]
- velar ejective fricative [xʼ] (in Tlingit, Tigrinya)
  - labialized velar ejective fricative [xʷʼ] (in Tlingit)
- uvular ejective fricative [χʼ] (in Georgian, Tlingit and isiXhosa)
  - labialized uvular ejective fricative [χʷʼ] (in Tlingit and isiXhosa)

=== Clicks ===
- Simple ejective clicks [kʘʼ], [kǀʼ], [kǁʼ], [kǃʼ], [kǂʼ] (all five in ǂ'Amkoe; alveolar/lateral/dental in isiXhosa)
- Labialized ejective clicks [ǀʷʼ], [ǁʷʼ], [ǃʷʼ] (in isiXhosa)
- Prenasalized ejective clicks [^{ŋ}ǀʼ], [^{ŋ}ǁʼ], [^{ŋ}ǃʼ] (phonemically in isiXhosa, spelled nkc/nkx/nkq)
- Prenasalized labialized ejective clicks [^{ŋ}ǀʷʼ], [^{ŋ}ǁʷʼ], [^{ŋ}ǃʷʼ] (in isiXhosa, spelled nkcw/nkxw/nkqw)
- Ejective-contour clicks

[ʘqʼ ǀqʼ ǁqʼ ǃqʼ ǂqʼ]
[ʘ̬qʼ ǀ̬qʼ ǁ̬qʼ ǃ̬qʼ ǂ̬qʼ]
[ʘqχʼ ǀqχʼ ǁqχʼ ǃqχʼ ǂqχʼ ~ ʘkxʼ ǀkxʼ ǁkxʼ ǃkxʼ ǂkxʼ ~ ʘk𝼄ʼ ǀk𝼄ʼ ǁk𝼄ʼ ǃk𝼄ʼ ǂk𝼄ʼ
[ʘ̬qχʼ ǀ̬qχʼ ǁ̬qχʼ ǃ̬qχʼ ǂ̬qχʼ ~ ʘ̬kxʼ ǀ̬kxʼ ǁ̬kxʼ ǃ̬kxʼ ǂ̬kxʼ ~ ʘ̬k𝼄ʼ ǀ̬k𝼄ʼ ǁ̬k𝼄ʼ ǃ̬k𝼄ʼ ǂ̬k𝼄ʼ

== Hypothesis ==
A pattern can be observed wherein ejectives correlate geographically with mountainous regions. Everett (2013) argues that the geographic correlation between languages with ejectives and mountainous terrains is because of decreased air pressure making ejectives easier to produce, as well as the way ejectives help to reduce water vapor loss. The argument has been criticized as being based on a spurious correlation.

== See also ==
- Glottalic consonant
- List of phonetics topics
- Beatboxing

== Bibliography ==
- Beck, David (2006). "The emergence of ejective fricatives in Upper Necaxa Totonac". University of Alberta Working Papers in Linguistics. 1: 1–18.
- Campbell, Lyle. 1973. On Glottalic Consonants. International Journal of American Linguistics 39, 44–46. JSTOR 1264659
- Chirikba, V.A. Aspects of Phonological Typology. Moscow, 1991 (in Russian).
- Everett, Caleb (2013), "Evidence for Direct Geographic Influences on Linguistic Sounds: The Case of Ejectives", PLOS One, 8 (6) e65275, Bibcode:2013PLoSO...865275E, doi:10.1371/journal.pone.0065275, PMC 3680446, PMID 23776463
- Fallon, Paul. 2002. The Synchronic and Diachronic Phonology of Ejectives. Routledge. ISBN 0-415-93800-7, ISBN 978-0-415-93800-6.
- Hogan, John T. (1976-07-01). "An Analysis of the Temporal Features of Ejective Consonants". Phonetica. 33 (4). Walter de Gruyter GmbH: 275–284. doi:10.1159/000259776. ISSN 1423-0321. S2CID 144724070.
- Greenberg, Joseph H. (1970), "Some generalizations concerning glottalic consonants, especially implosives.", International Journal of American Linguistics, 36 (2): 123–145, doi:10.1086/465105, S2CID 143225017
- Ladefoged, Peter (2005), Vowels and Consonants (Second ed.), Blackwell, ISBN 0-631-21411-9
- Ladefoged, Peter; Maddieson, Ian (1996). The Sounds of the World's Languages. Oxford: Blackwell. ISBN 0-631-19815-6.
- Lewis, Martin W.; Pereltsvaig, Asya (17 June 2013). "Ejectives, High Altitudes, and Grandiose Linguistic Hypotheses". GeoCurrents. Archived from the original on 17 April 2014.
- Liberman, Mark (14 June 2013). "High-altitude ejectives". Language Log.
- Lindau, Mona (1984). "Phonetic differences in glottalic consonants". Journal of Phonetics. 12 (2). Elsevier BV: 147–155. doi:10.1016/s0095-4470(19)30861-7. ISSN 0095-4470.
- Lindsey, Geoffrey; Hayward, Katrina; Haruna, Andrew (1992). "Hausa Glottalic Consonants: A Laryngographic Study". Bulletin of the School of Oriental and African Studies. 55 (3): 511–527. doi:10.1017/S0041977X00003682. S2CID 143934037.
- Taddese, Takkele (1992). "Are sʼ and tʼ variants of an Amharic variable? A sociolinguistic analysis". Journal of Ethiopian Languages and Literature. 2: 104–21.
- Wier, Thomas (19 June 2013). "Ejectives, Altitude, and the Caucasus as a Linguistic Area". Diversity Linguistics Comment.
- Wright, Richard; Hargus, Sharon; Davis, Katharine (2002). "On the categorization of ejectives: data from Witsuwit'en". Journal of the International Phonetic Association. 32: 43–77. doi:10.1017/S0025100302000142. S2CID 145579984.

Place →	Labial					Coronal										Dorsal					Laryngeal			
Manner ↓	Bilabial		Labiodental		Linguolabial		Dental		Alveolar		Postalveolar		Retroflex		(Alveolo-)palatal		Velar		Uvular		Pharyngeal/epiglottal		Glottal	
Nasal	m̥	m	ɱ̊	ɱ		n̼	n̪̊	n̪	n̥	n	n̠̊	n̠	ɳ̊	ɳ	ɲ̊	ɲ	ŋ̊	ŋ	ɴ̥	ɴ				
Plosive	p	b	p̪	b̪	t̼	d̼	t̪	d̪	t	d			ʈ	ɖ	c	ɟ	k	ɡ	q	ɢ	ʡ		ʔ	
Sibilant affricate							t̪s̪	d̪z̪	ts	dz	t̠ʃ	d̠ʒ	tʂ	dʐ	tɕ	dʑ								
Non-sibilant affricate	pɸ	bβ	p̪f	b̪v			t̪θ	d̪ð	tɹ̝̊	dɹ̝	t̠ɹ̠̊˔	d̠ɹ̠˔			cç	ɟʝ	kx	ɡɣ	qχ	ɢʁ	ʡʜ	ʡʢ	ʔh	
Sibilant fricative							s̪	z̪	s	z	ʃ	ʒ	ʂ	ʐ	ɕ	ʑ								
Non-sibilant fricative	ɸ	β	f	v	θ̼	ð̼	θ	ð	θ̠	ð̠	ɹ̠̊˔	ɹ̠˔	ɻ̊˔	ɻ˔	ç	ʝ	x	ɣ	χ	ʁ	ħ	ʕ	h	ɦ
Approximant		β̞		ʋ				ð̞		ɹ		ɹ̠		ɻ		j		ɰ						˷
Tap/flap		ⱱ̟		ⱱ					ɾ̥	ɾ			ɽ̊	ɽ						ɢ̆		ʡ̆		
Trill	ʙ̥	ʙ							r̥	r		r̠	ɽ̊r̥	ɽr					ʀ̥	ʀ	ʜ	ʢ		
Lateral affricate									tɬ	dɮ			tꞎ	d𝼅	c𝼆	ɟʎ̝	k𝼄	ɡʟ̝						
Lateral fricative							ɬ̪		ɬ	ɮ			ꞎ	𝼅	𝼆	ʎ̝	𝼄	ʟ̝						
Lateral approximant								l̪	l̥	l		l̠	ɭ̊	ɭ	ʎ̥	ʎ	ʟ̥	ʟ		ʟ̠				
Lateral tap/flap									ɺ̥	ɺ			𝼈̊	𝼈		ʎ̆		ʟ̆						

		BL	LD	D	A	PA	RF	P	V	U
Implosive	Voiced	ɓ			ɗ		ᶑ	ʄ	ɠ	ʛ
Implosive	Voiceless	ɓ̥			ɗ̥		ᶑ̊	ʄ̊	ɠ̊	ʛ̥
Ejective	Stop	pʼ			tʼ		ʈʼ	cʼ	kʼ	qʼ
Ejective	Affricate		p̪fʼ	tθʼ	tsʼ	tʃʼ	tʂʼ	tɕʼ	kxʼ	qχʼ
Ejective	Fricative	ɸʼ	fʼ	θʼ	sʼ	ʃʼ	ʂʼ	ɕʼ	xʼ	χʼ
Ejective	Lateral affricate				tɬʼ			c𝼆ʼ	k𝼄ʼ	q𝼄ʼ
Ejective	Lateral fricative				ɬʼ					
Click (top: velar; bottom: uvular)	Tenuis	kʘ qʘ		kǀ qǀ	kǃ qǃ		k𝼊 q𝼊	kǂ qǂ		
Click (top: velar; bottom: uvular)	Voiced	ɡʘ ɢʘ		ɡǀ ɢǀ	ɡǃ ɢǃ		ɡ𝼊 ɢ𝼊	ɡǂ ɢǂ		
Click (top: velar; bottom: uvular)	Nasal	ŋʘ ɴʘ		ŋǀ ɴǀ	ŋǃ ɴǃ		ŋ𝼊 ɴ𝼊	ŋǂ ɴǂ	ʞ	
Click (top: velar; bottom: uvular)	Tenuis lateral				kǁ qǁ					
Click (top: velar; bottom: uvular)	Voiced lateral				ɡǁ ɢǁ					
Click (top: velar; bottom: uvular)	Nasal lateral				ŋǁ ɴǁ					
