= Consonant =

Speech sound articulated by closing the vocal tract fully or partially

In articulatory phonetics, a consonant is a speech sound that is articulated with complete or partial closure of the vocal tract. Examples are [p] and [b], pronounced with the lips; [t] and [d], pronounced with the front of the tongue; [k] and [g], pronounced with the back of the tongue; [h], pronounced with the glottis; [f], [v], [s], and [z] pronounced by forcing air through a narrow channel (fricatives); and [m] and [n], which have air flowing through the nose (nasals). Most consonants are pulmonic, using air pressure from the lungs to generate a sound. Very few natural languages are non-pulmonic, making use of ejectives, implosives, and clicks. Contrasting with consonants are vowels.

Since the number of speech sounds in the world's languages is much greater than the number of letters in any one alphabet, linguists have devised systems such as the International Phonetic Alphabet (IPA) to assign a unique and unambiguous symbol to each attested consonant. The English alphabet has fewer consonant letters than the English language has consonant sounds, so digraphs like ⟨ch⟩, ⟨sh⟩, ⟨th⟩, and ⟨ng⟩ are used to extend the alphabet, though some letters and digraphs represent more than one consonant. For example, the sound spelled ⟨th⟩ in "this" is a different consonant from the ⟨th⟩ sound in "thin". (In the IPA, these are [ð] and [θ], respectively.)

== Etymology ==
The word consonant comes from Latin oblique stem cōnsonant-, from cōnsonāns 'sounding-together', a calque of Greek σύμφωνον sýmphōnon (plural sýmphōna, σύμφωνα).

Dionysius Thrax, a Classical Greek grammarian, called consonants sýmphōna (σύμφωνα 'sounded with') because in Greek, they can only be pronounced with a vowel. (Note: Dionysius Thrax: σύμφωνα δὲ τὰ λοιπὰ ἑπτακαίδεκα· β γ δ ζ θ κ λ μ ν ξ π ρ σ τ φ χ ψ. σύμφωνα δὲ +λέγονται+, ὅτι αὐτὰ μὲν καθ᾽ ἑαυτὰ φωνὴν οὐκ ἔχει, συντασσόμενα δὲ μετὰ τῶν φωνηέντων φωνὴν ἀποτελεῖ. The remaining seventeen are consonants: b, g, d, z, th, k, l, m, n, x, p, r, s, t, ph, ch, ps. They are called 'sounded with' because they do not have a sound on their own, but, when arranged with vowels, they produce a sound.) He divides them into two subcategories: hēmíphōna (ἡμίφωνα 'half-sounded'), which are the continuants, (Note: Dionysius Thrax: τούτων ἡμίφωνα μέν ἐστιν ὀκτώ· ζ ξ ψ λ μ ν ρ σ. ἡμίφωνα δὲ λέγεται, ὅτι παρ᾽ ὅσον ἧττον τῶν φωνηέντων εὔφωνα καθέστηκεν ἔν τε τοῖς μυγμοῖς καὶ σιγμοῖς. Of these, eight are half-sounded: z, x, ps, l, m, n, r, s. They are called 'half-sounded' because, though a little weaker than the vowels, they are still harmonious [well-sounding] in their moaning and hissing.) and áphōna (ἄφωνος 'unsounded'), which correspond to plosives. (Note: Dionysius Thrax: ἄφωνα δέ ἐστιν ἐννέα· β γ δ κ π τ θ φ χ. ἄφωνα δὲ λέγεται, ὅτι μᾶλλον τῶν ἄλλων ἐστὶν κακόφωνα, ὥσπερ ἄφωνον λέγομεν τὸν τραγωιδὸν τὸν κακόφωνον. Nine are unsounded: b, g, d, k, p, t, th, ph, ch. They are called 'unsounded' because, more than the others, they are discordant [ill-sounding], just as we call the ill-sounding tragedist 'unsounded'.)

This description does not apply to some languages, such as the Salishan languages, in which plosives may occur without vowels (see Nuxalk), and the modern concept of "consonant" does not require co-occurrence with a vowel.

== Consonant sounds and consonant letters ==
The word consonant may be used ambiguously for both speech sounds and the letters of the alphabet used to write them. In English, these letters are B, C, D, F, G, J, K, L, M, N, P, Q, S, T, V, X, Z and often H, R, W, Y.

In English orthography, the letters H, R, W, Y and the digraph GH are used for both consonants and vowels. For instance, the letter Y stands for the consonant/semi-vowel /j/ in yoke, the vowel /ɪ/ in myth, the vowel /i/ in funny, the diphthong /aɪ/ in sky, and forms several digraphs for other diphthongs, such as say, boy. Similarly, R commonly indicates or modifies a vowel in non-rhotic accents.

This article is concerned with consonant sounds, however they are written.

== Consonants versus vowels ==
Consonants and vowels correspond to distinct parts of a syllable: The most sonorous part of the syllable, called the syllabic peak or nucleus, is typically a vowel, while the less sonorous margins (called the onset and coda) are typically consonants. Such syllables may be abbreviated CV, V, and CVC, where C stands for consonant and V stands for vowel. This can be argued to be the only pattern found in most of the world's languages, and perhaps the primary pattern in all of them. However, the distinction between consonant and vowel is not always clear cut: there are syllabic consonants and non-syllabic vowels in many of the world's languages.

One blurry area is in segments variously called semivowels, semiconsonants, or glides. On one side, there are vowel-like segments that are not in themselves syllabic, but form diphthongs as part of the syllable nucleus, as the i in English boil [ˈbɔɪ̯l]. On the other, there are approximants that behave like consonants in forming onsets, but are articulated very much like vowels, as the y in English yes [ˈjɛs]. Some phonologists model these as both being the underlying vowel /i/, so that the English word bit would phonemically be /bit/, beet would be /bii̯t/, and yield would be phonemically /i̯ii̯ld/. Likewise, foot would be /fut/, food would be /fuu̯d/, wood would be /u̯ud/, and wooed would be /u̯uu̯d/. However, there is a (perhaps allophonic) difference in articulation between these segments, with the [j] in [ˈjɛs] yes and [ˈjiʲld] yield and the [w] of [ˈwuʷd] wooed having more constriction and a more definite place of articulation than the [ɪ] in [ˈbɔɪ̯l] boil or [ˈbɪt] bit or the [ʊ] of [ˈfʊt] foot.

The other problematic area is that of syllabic consonants, segments articulated as consonants but occupying the nucleus of a syllable. This may be the case for words such as church in rhotic dialects of English, although phoneticians differ in whether they consider this to be a syllabic consonant, /ˈtʃɹ̩tʃ/, or a rhotic vowel, /ˈtʃɝtʃ/: Some distinguish an approximant /ɹ/ that corresponds to a vowel /ɝ/, for rural as /ˈɹɝl/ or [ˈɹʷɝːl̩]; others see these as a single phoneme, /ˈɹɹ̩l/.

Other languages use fricative and often trilled segments as syllabic nuclei, as in Czech and several languages in Democratic Republic of the Congo, and China, including Mandarin. In Mandarin, they are historically allophones of /i/, and spelled that way in Pinyin. Ladefoged and Maddieson call these "fricative vowels" and say that "they can usually be thought of as syllabic fricatives that are allophones of vowels". That is, phonetically they are consonants, but phonemically they behave as vowels.

Many Slavic languages allow the trill [r̩] and the lateral [l̩] as syllabic nuclei (see Words without vowels). In languages like Nuxalk, it is difficult to know what the nucleus of a syllable is, or if all syllables even have nuclei. If the concept of 'syllable' applies in Nuxalk, there are syllabic consonants in words like /sx̩s/ (/s̩xs̩/?) 'seal fat'. Miyako in Japan is similar, with /f̩ks̩/ 'to build' and /ps̩ks̩/ 'to pull'.

Each spoken consonant can be distinguished by several phonetic features:

- The manner of articulation is how air escapes from the vocal tract when the consonant or approximant (vowel-like) sound is made. Manners include stops, fricatives, and nasals.
- The place of articulation is where in the vocal tract the obstruction of the consonant occurs, and which speech organs are involved. Places include bilabial (both lips), alveolar (tongue against the gum ridge), and velar (tongue against soft palate). In addition, there may be a simultaneous narrowing at another place of articulation, such as palatalisation or pharyngealisation. Consonants with two simultaneous places of articulation are said to be coarticulated.
- The phonation of a consonant is how the vocal cords vibrate during the articulation. When the vocal cords vibrate fully, the consonant is called voiced; when they do not vibrate at all, it is voiceless.
- The voice onset time (VOT) indicates the timing of the phonation. Aspiration is a feature of VOT.
- The airstream mechanism is how the air moving through the vocal tract is powered. Most languages have exclusively pulmonic egressive consonants, which use the lungs and diaphragm, but ejectives, clicks, and implosives use different mechanisms.
- The length is how long the obstruction of a consonant lasts. This feature is borderline distinctive in English, as in "wholly" [hoʊlli] vs. "holy" [hoʊli], but cases are limited to morpheme boundaries. Unrelated roots are differentiated in various languages such as Italian, Japanese, and Finnish, with two length levels, "single" and "geminate". Estonian and some Sami languages have three phonemic lengths: short, geminate, and long geminate, although the distinction between the geminate and overlong geminate includes suprasegmental features.
- The articulatory force is how much muscular energy is involved. This has been proposed many times, but no distinction relying exclusively on force has ever been demonstrated.

All English consonants can be classified by a combination of these features, such as "voiceless alveolar stop" [t]. In this case, the airstream mechanism is omitted.

Some pairs of consonants like p::b, t::d are sometimes called fortis and lenis, but this is a phonological rather than phonetic distinction.

Consonants are scheduled by their features in a number of IPA charts:

IPA: Pulmonic consonants

Place →	Labial					Coronal										Dorsal					Laryngeal			
Manner ↓	Bilabial		Labiodental		Linguolabial		Dental		Alveolar		Postalveolar		Retroflex		(Alveolo-)palatal		Velar		Uvular		Pharyngeal/epiglottal		Glottal	
Nasal	m̥	m	ɱ̊	ɱ		n̼	n̪̊	n̪	n̥	n	n̠̊	n̠	ɳ̊	ɳ	ɲ̊	ɲ	ŋ̊	ŋ	ɴ̥	ɴ				
Plosive	p	b	p̪	b̪	t̼	d̼	t̪	d̪	t	d			ʈ	ɖ	c	ɟ	k	ɡ	q	ɢ	ʡ		ʔ	
Sibilant affricate							t̪s̪	d̪z̪	ts	dz	t̠ʃ	d̠ʒ	tʂ	dʐ	tɕ	dʑ								
Non-sibilant affricate	pɸ	bβ	p̪f	b̪v			t̪θ	d̪ð	tɹ̝̊	dɹ̝	t̠ɹ̠̊˔	d̠ɹ̠˔			cç	ɟʝ	kx	ɡɣ	qχ	ɢʁ	ʡʜ	ʡʢ	ʔh	
Sibilant fricative							s̪	z̪	s	z	ʃ	ʒ	ʂ	ʐ	ɕ	ʑ								
Non-sibilant fricative	ɸ	β	f	v	θ̼	ð̼	θ	ð	θ̠	ð̠	ɹ̠̊˔	ɹ̠˔	ɻ̊˔	ɻ˔	ç	ʝ	x	ɣ	χ	ʁ	ħ	ʕ	h	ɦ
Approximant		β̞		ʋ				ð̞		ɹ		ɹ̠		ɻ		j		ɰ						˷
Tap/flap		ⱱ̟		ⱱ					ɾ̥	ɾ			ɽ̊	ɽ						ɢ̆		ʡ̆		
Trill	ʙ̥	ʙ							r̥	r		r̠	ɽ̊r̥	ɽr					ʀ̥	ʀ	ʜ	ʢ		
Lateral affricate									tɬ	dɮ			tꞎ	d𝼅	c𝼆	ɟʎ̝	k𝼄	ɡʟ̝						
Lateral fricative							ɬ̪		ɬ	ɮ			ꞎ	𝼅	𝼆	ʎ̝	𝼄	ʟ̝						
Lateral approximant								l̪	l̥	l		l̠	ɭ̊	ɭ	ʎ̥	ʎ	ʟ̥	ʟ		ʟ̠				
Lateral tap/flap									ɺ̥	ɺ			𝼈̊	𝼈		ʎ̆		ʟ̆						

- IPA help
- audio
- full chart
- template

Symbols to the right in a cell are voiced, to the left are voiceless. Shaded areas denote articulations judged impossible.

IPA: Non-pulmonic consonants

		BL	LD	D	A	PA	RF	P	V	U
Implosive	Voiced	ɓ			ɗ		ᶑ	ʄ	ɠ	ʛ
Implosive	Voiceless	ɓ̥			ɗ̥		ᶑ̊	ʄ̊	ɠ̊	ʛ̥
Ejective	Stop	pʼ			tʼ		ʈʼ	cʼ	kʼ	qʼ
Ejective	Affricate		p̪fʼ	t̪θʼ	tsʼ	t̠ʃʼ	tʂʼ	tɕʼ	kxʼ	qχʼ
Ejective	Fricative	ɸʼ	fʼ	θʼ	sʼ	ʃʼ	ʂʼ	ɕʼ	xʼ	χʼ
Ejective	Lateral affricate				tɬʼ			c𝼆ʼ	k𝼄ʼ	q𝼄ʼ
Ejective	Lateral fricative				ɬʼ					
Click (top: velar; bottom: uvular)	Tenuis	kʘ qʘ		kǀ qǀ	kǃ qǃ		k𝼊 q𝼊	kǂ qǂ		
Click (top: velar; bottom: uvular)	Voiced	ɡʘ ɢʘ		ɡǀ ɢǀ	ɡǃ ɢǃ		ɡ𝼊 ɢ𝼊	ɡǂ ɢǂ		
Click (top: velar; bottom: uvular)	Nasal	ŋʘ ɴʘ		ŋǀ ɴǀ	ŋǃ ɴǃ		ŋ𝼊 ɴ𝼊	ŋǂ ɴǂ	ʞ	
Click (top: velar; bottom: uvular)	Tenuis lateral				kǁ qǁ					
Click (top: velar; bottom: uvular)	Voiced lateral				ɡǁ ɢǁ					
Click (top: velar; bottom: uvular)	Nasal lateral				ŋǁ ɴǁ					

- IPA help
- audio
- full chart
- template
IPA: Co-articulated consonants
Nasal
n͡m
Labial–alveolar
ɳ͡m
Labial–retroflex
ŋ͡m
Labial–velar
Plosive
t͡p
d͡b
Labial–alveolar
ʈ͡p
ɖ͡b
Labial–retroflex
k͡p
ɡ͡b
Labial–velar
q͡ʡ
Uvular–epiglottal
q͡p
Labial–uvular
Fricative/approximant
ɥ̊
ɥ
Labialized palatal
ʍ
w
Labialized velar
ɧ
Sj-sound (variable)
Lateral approximant
ɫ
Velarized alveolar
Implosive
ɠ̊͜ɓ̥
ɠ͡ɓ
Labial–velar
Ejective
t͡pʼ
Labial–alveolar

- IPA help
- full chart
- template

== Examples ==
The recently extinct Ubykh language had only 2 or 3 vowels but 84 consonants; the Taa language has 87 consonants under one analysis, 164 under another, plus some 30 vowels and tone. The types of consonants used in various languages are by no means universal. For instance, nearly all Australian languages lack fricatives; a large percentage of the world's languages lack voiced stops such as /b/, /d/, /ɡ/ as phonemes, though they may appear phonetically. Most languages, however, do include one or more fricatives, with /s/ being the most common, and a liquid consonant or two, with /l/ the most common. The approximant /w/ is also widespread, and virtually all languages have one or more nasals, though a very few, such as the Central dialect of Rotokas, lack even these. This last language has the smallest number of consonants in the world, with just six.

=== Most common ===
In rhotic American English, the consonants spoken most frequently are /n, ɹ, t/. (/ɹ/ is less common in non-rhotic accents.) The most frequent consonant in many other languages is /p/.

The most universal consonants around the world (that is, the ones appearing in nearly all languages) are the three voiceless stops /p/, /t/, /k/, and the two nasals /m/, /n/. However, even these common five are not completely universal. Several languages in the vicinity of the Sahara Desert, including Arabic, lack /p/. Several languages of North America, such as Mohawk, lack both of the labials /p/ and /m/. The Wichita language of Oklahoma and some West African languages, such as Ijo, lack the consonant /n/ on a phonemic level, but do use it phonetically, as an allophone of another consonant (of /l/ in the case of Ijo, and of /ɾ/ in Wichita). A few languages on Bougainville Island and around Puget Sound, such as Makah, lack both of the nasals [m] and [n] altogether, except in special speech registers such as baby-talk. The 'click language' Nǁng lacks /t/, (Note: Nǀu has /ts/ instead. Hawaiian is often said to lack /t/, but it actually has a consonant that varies between [t] and [k].) and colloquial Samoan lacks both alveolars, /t/ and /n/. (Note: Samoan words written with the letters t and n pronounce them as [k] and [ŋ] except in formal speech. However, Samoan does have another alveolar consonant, /l/.) Despite the 80-odd consonants of Ubykh, it lacks the plain velar /k/ in native words, as do the related Adyghe and Kabardian languages. But with a few striking exceptions, such as Xavante and Tahitian—which have no dorsal consonants whatsoever—nearly all other languages have at least one velar consonant: most of the few languages that do not have a simple /k/ (that is, a sound that is generally pronounced [k]) have a consonant that is very similar. (Note: The Niʻihau–Kauaʻi dialect of Hawaiian is often said to have no [k], but as in other dialects of Hawaiian it has a consonant that varies between [t] and [k].) For instance, an areal feature of the Pacific Northwest coast is that historical *k has become palatalized in many languages, so that Saanich for example has /tʃ/ and /kʷ/ but no plain /k/; similarly, historical *k in the Northwest Caucasian languages became palatalized to /kʲ/ in extinct Ubykh and to /tʃ/ in most Circassian dialects.

== See also ==
- IPA consonant chart with audio
- Articulatory phonetics
- List of consonants
- List of phonetics topics
- Words without vowels

== Sources ==
- Ian Maddieson, Patterns of Sounds, Cambridge University Press, 1984. ISBN 0-521-26536-3

Place →	Labial					Coronal										Dorsal					Laryngeal			
Manner ↓	Bilabial		Labiodental		Linguolabial		Dental		Alveolar		Postalveolar		Retroflex		(Alveolo-)palatal		Velar		Uvular		Pharyngeal/epiglottal		Glottal	
Nasal	m̥	m	ɱ̊	ɱ		n̼	n̪̊	n̪	n̥	n	n̠̊	n̠	ɳ̊	ɳ	ɲ̊	ɲ	ŋ̊	ŋ	ɴ̥	ɴ				
Plosive	p	b	p̪	b̪	t̼	d̼	t̪	d̪	t	d			ʈ	ɖ	c	ɟ	k	ɡ	q	ɢ	ʡ		ʔ	
Sibilant affricate							t̪s̪	d̪z̪	ts	dz	t̠ʃ	d̠ʒ	tʂ	dʐ	tɕ	dʑ								
Non-sibilant affricate	pɸ	bβ	p̪f	b̪v			t̪θ	d̪ð	tɹ̝̊	dɹ̝	t̠ɹ̠̊˔	d̠ɹ̠˔			cç	ɟʝ	kx	ɡɣ	qχ	ɢʁ	ʡʜ	ʡʢ	ʔh	
Sibilant fricative							s̪	z̪	s	z	ʃ	ʒ	ʂ	ʐ	ɕ	ʑ								
Non-sibilant fricative	ɸ	β	f	v	θ̼	ð̼	θ	ð	θ̠	ð̠	ɹ̠̊˔	ɹ̠˔	ɻ̊˔	ɻ˔	ç	ʝ	x	ɣ	χ	ʁ	ħ	ʕ	h	ɦ
Approximant		β̞		ʋ				ð̞		ɹ		ɹ̠		ɻ		j		ɰ						˷
Tap/flap		ⱱ̟		ⱱ					ɾ̥	ɾ			ɽ̊	ɽ						ɢ̆		ʡ̆		
Trill	ʙ̥	ʙ							r̥	r		r̠	ɽ̊r̥	ɽr					ʀ̥	ʀ	ʜ	ʢ		
Lateral affricate									tɬ	dɮ			tꞎ	d𝼅	c𝼆	ɟʎ̝	k𝼄	ɡʟ̝						
Lateral fricative							ɬ̪		ɬ	ɮ			ꞎ	𝼅	𝼆	ʎ̝	𝼄	ʟ̝						
Lateral approximant								l̪	l̥	l		l̠	ɭ̊	ɭ	ʎ̥	ʎ	ʟ̥	ʟ		ʟ̠				
Lateral tap/flap									ɺ̥	ɺ			𝼈̊	𝼈		ʎ̆		ʟ̆						

		BL	LD	D	A	PA	RF	P	V	U
Implosive	Voiced	ɓ			ɗ		ᶑ	ʄ	ɠ	ʛ
Implosive	Voiceless	ɓ̥			ɗ̥		ᶑ̊	ʄ̊	ɠ̊	ʛ̥
Ejective	Stop	pʼ			tʼ		ʈʼ	cʼ	kʼ	qʼ
Ejective	Affricate		p̪fʼ	t̪θʼ	tsʼ	t̠ʃʼ	tʂʼ	tɕʼ	kxʼ	qχʼ
Ejective	Fricative	ɸʼ	fʼ	θʼ	sʼ	ʃʼ	ʂʼ	ɕʼ	xʼ	χʼ
Ejective	Lateral affricate				tɬʼ			c𝼆ʼ	k𝼄ʼ	q𝼄ʼ
Ejective	Lateral fricative				ɬʼ					
Click (top: velar; bottom: uvular)	Tenuis	kʘ qʘ		kǀ qǀ	kǃ qǃ		k𝼊 q𝼊	kǂ qǂ		
Click (top: velar; bottom: uvular)	Voiced	ɡʘ ɢʘ		ɡǀ ɢǀ	ɡǃ ɢǃ		ɡ𝼊 ɢ𝼊	ɡǂ ɢǂ		
Click (top: velar; bottom: uvular)	Nasal	ŋʘ ɴʘ		ŋǀ ɴǀ	ŋǃ ɴǃ		ŋ𝼊 ɴ𝼊	ŋǂ ɴǂ	ʞ	
Click (top: velar; bottom: uvular)	Tenuis lateral				kǁ qǁ					
Click (top: velar; bottom: uvular)	Voiced lateral				ɡǁ ɢǁ					
Click (top: velar; bottom: uvular)	Nasal lateral				ŋǁ ɴǁ					
