= Ejective click =

Ejective clicks may be:

- Ejective-contour clicks, consonants that transition from a click to an ejective sound
- Ejective oral non-contour glottalized clicks
