= Alveolar ejective affricate =

Type of consonantal sound

tsʼ

ʦʼ

Audio sample
- source · help

Encoding
- X-SAMPA: ts_>

An alveolar ejective affricate is a type of consonantal sound, used in some spoken languages. The symbol in the International Phonetic Alphabet that represents this sound is ⟨t͡sʼ⟩ or ⟨t͜sʼ⟩.

== Features ==
Features of an alveolar ejective affricate:

- Its manner of articulation is sibilant affricate, which means it is produced by first stopping the air flow entirely, then directing it with the tongue to the sharp edge of the teeth, causing high-frequency turbulence.
- Its place of articulation is alveolar, which means it is articulated with either the tip or the blade of the tongue at the alveolar ridge, termed respectively apical and laminal.
- Its phonation is voiceless, which means it is produced without vibrations of the vocal cords.
- It is an oral consonant, which means that air is not allowed to escape through the nose.
- It is a median consonant, which means it is produced by directing the airstream down the midline of the tongue, rather than to the sides.
- The airstream mechanism is ejective (glottalic egressive), which means the air is forced out by pumping the glottis upward.

== Occurrence ==
Language		Word	IPA	Meaning	Notes
Abaza		хъацIа / qac'a	[qat͡sʼa]	'man'	
Abkhaz		днықәҵан / dnyķwc̄an	[dnɨkʷʰt͡sʼan]	'put'	
Adyghe		папцӀэ / pápc'a	[pʰaːpt͡sʼa]	'sharp'	
Amharic		ፀጉር / cegur	[t͡sʼəgur]	'hair'	
Armenian	Yerevan dialect	ծառ / caŕ	[t͡sʼɑr]	'tree'	Corresponds to tenuis [t͡s⁼] in other Eastern dialects.
Avar		мацӀ / mac'	[mat͡sʼ]	'language'	
Chechen		цIе / c'e / ڗە	[t͡sʼe]	'name'	
Georgian		წელი / c'eli	[t͡sʼeli]	'year'	
Hadza		zzapale	[t͡sʼapaɾe]	'digging stick'	
Haida		ttsanskkaagid	[t͡sʼanskʼaːkit]	'beams'	
Hausa		tsoro	[t͡sʼoro]	'fear'	
Kabardian		цӀэ / çe / ڗە	[t͡sʼa]	'name'	
Lak		цIа / ċа / ڗا	[t͡sʼa]	'name'	
Laz	Atina-Artasheni dialect	წუნა / ǯuna	[t͡sʼunɑ]	'pain' or 'ache'	
Laz	Vitse dialect	წკუნა / ǯǩuna	[t͡sʼk’unɑ]	'pain' or 'ache'	
Lushootseed	Northern Lushootseed	c̓uʔkʷs	[t͡sʼuʔkʷs]	'seven'	
Lushootseed	Southern Lushootseed	c̓uʔkʷs	[t͡sʼoʔkʷs]	'seven'	
North Straits Salish	Saanich		[t̪s̪ʼˈakʼʷiʔ]	'skunk cabbage'	Rarely realized as [t̪θʼ]
Nuxalk		tsʼxw	[t͡sʼχʷ]	'white'	
Ossetian	Iron	цъæх / c'ah	[t͡sʼəχ]	'blue' or 'green'	
Q'eqchi'		tzʼiʼ	[t͡sʼiʔ]	'dog'	
Tlingit		tsʼankwaat	[t͡sʼankʷʰaːt]	'spider'	

== See also ==
- Index of phonetics articles

Place →	Labial					Coronal										Dorsal					Laryngeal			
Manner ↓	Bilabial		Labiodental		Linguolabial		Dental		Alveolar		Postalveolar		Retroflex		(Alveolo-)palatal		Velar		Uvular		Pharyngeal/epiglottal		Glottal	
Nasal	m̥	m	ɱ̊	ɱ		n̼	n̪̊	n̪	n̥	n	n̠̊	n̠	ɳ̊	ɳ	ɲ̊	ɲ	ŋ̊	ŋ	ɴ̥	ɴ				
Plosive	p	b	p̪	b̪	t̼	d̼	t̪	d̪	t	d			ʈ	ɖ	c	ɟ	k	ɡ	q	ɢ	ʡ		ʔ	
Sibilant affricate							t̪s̪	d̪z̪	ts	dz	t̠ʃ	d̠ʒ	tʂ	dʐ	tɕ	dʑ								
Non-sibilant affricate	pɸ	bβ	p̪f	b̪v			t̪θ	d̪ð	tɹ̝̊	dɹ̝	t̠ɹ̠̊˔	d̠ɹ̠˔			cç	ɟʝ	kx	ɡɣ	qχ	ɢʁ	ʡʜ	ʡʢ	ʔh	
Sibilant fricative							s̪	z̪	s	z	ʃ	ʒ	ʂ	ʐ	ɕ	ʑ								
Non-sibilant fricative	ɸ	β	f	v	θ̼	ð̼	θ	ð	θ̠	ð̠	ɹ̠̊˔	ɹ̠˔	ɻ̊˔	ɻ˔	ç	ʝ	x	ɣ	χ	ʁ	ħ	ʕ	h	ɦ
Approximant		β̞		ʋ				ð̞		ɹ		ɹ̠		ɻ		j		ɰ						˷
Tap/flap		ⱱ̟		ⱱ					ɾ̥	ɾ			ɽ̊	ɽ						ɢ̆		ʡ̆		
Trill	ʙ̥	ʙ							r̥	r		r̠	ɽ̊r̥	ɽr					ʀ̥	ʀ	ʜ	ʢ		
Lateral affricate									tɬ	dɮ			tꞎ	d𝼅	c𝼆	ɟʎ̝	k𝼄	ɡʟ̝						
Lateral fricative							ɬ̪		ɬ	ɮ			ꞎ	𝼅	𝼆	ʎ̝	𝼄	ʟ̝						
Lateral approximant								l̪	l̥	l		l̠	ɭ̊	ɭ	ʎ̥	ʎ	ʟ̥	ʟ		ʟ̠				
Lateral tap/flap									ɺ̥	ɺ			𝼈̊	𝼈		ʎ̆		ʟ̆						

		BL	LD	D	A	PA	RF	P	V	U
Implosive	Voiced	ɓ			ɗ		ᶑ	ʄ	ɠ	ʛ
Implosive	Voiceless	ɓ̥			ɗ̥		ᶑ̊	ʄ̊	ɠ̊	ʛ̥
Ejective	Stop	pʼ			tʼ		ʈʼ	cʼ	kʼ	qʼ
Ejective	Affricate		p̪fʼ	t̪θʼ	tsʼ	t̠ʃʼ	tʂʼ	tɕʼ	kxʼ	qχʼ
Ejective	Fricative	ɸʼ	fʼ	θʼ	sʼ	ʃʼ	ʂʼ	ɕʼ	xʼ	χʼ
Ejective	Lateral affricate				tɬʼ			c𝼆ʼ	k𝼄ʼ	q𝼄ʼ
Ejective	Lateral fricative				ɬʼ					
Click (top: velar; bottom: uvular)	Tenuis	kʘ qʘ		kǀ qǀ	kǃ qǃ		k𝼊 q𝼊	kǂ qǂ		
Click (top: velar; bottom: uvular)	Voiced	ɡʘ ɢʘ		ɡǀ ɢǀ	ɡǃ ɢǃ		ɡ𝼊 ɢ𝼊	ɡǂ ɢǂ		
Click (top: velar; bottom: uvular)	Nasal	ŋʘ ɴʘ		ŋǀ ɴǀ	ŋǃ ɴǃ		ŋ𝼊 ɴ𝼊	ŋǂ ɴǂ	ʞ	
Click (top: velar; bottom: uvular)	Tenuis lateral				kǁ qǁ					
Click (top: velar; bottom: uvular)	Voiced lateral				ɡǁ ɢǁ					
Click (top: velar; bottom: uvular)	Nasal lateral				ŋǁ ɴǁ					
