= Close central unrounded vowel =

Vowel sound represented by ⟨ɨ⟩ in IPA

ɨ
- IPA number: 317

Audio sample
- source · help

Encoding
- Entity (decimal): &#616;
- Unicode (hex): U+0268
- X-SAMPA: 1
- Braille: ⠴ (braille pattern dots-356) ⠊ (braille pattern dots-24)
Image

IPA: Vowels

	Front	Central	Back
Close	i y	ɨ ʉ	ɯ u
Near-close	ɪ ʏ		ʊ
Close-mid	e ø	ɘ ɵ	ɤ o
Mid	e̞ ø̞	ə	ɤ̞ o̞
Open-mid	ɛ œ	ɜ ɞ	ʌ ɔ
Near-open	æ	ɐ
Open	a ɶ	ä	ɑ ɒ

- IPA help
- audio
- full chart
- template

Legend: unrounded • rounded

The close central unrounded vowel, or high central unrounded vowel, is a type of vowel sound used in some languages. The symbol in the International Phonetic Alphabet that represents this sound is ⟨ɨ⟩, namely the lower-case letter i with a horizontal bar. Both the symbol and the sound are commonly referred to as barred i.

Occasionally, this vowel is transcribed ⟨ï⟩ (centralized ⟨i⟩) or ⟨ɯ̈⟩ (centralized ⟨ɯ⟩).

The close central unrounded vowel is the vocalic equivalent of the rare post-palatal approximant [ȷ̈].

== Features ==
- Its vowel height is close, also known as high, which means the tongue is positioned close to the roof of the mouth without creating a constriction that would be classified as a consonant.
- Its vowel backness is central, which means the tongue is positioned halfway between a front vowel and a back vowel.
- It is unrounded, which means that the lips are not rounded.

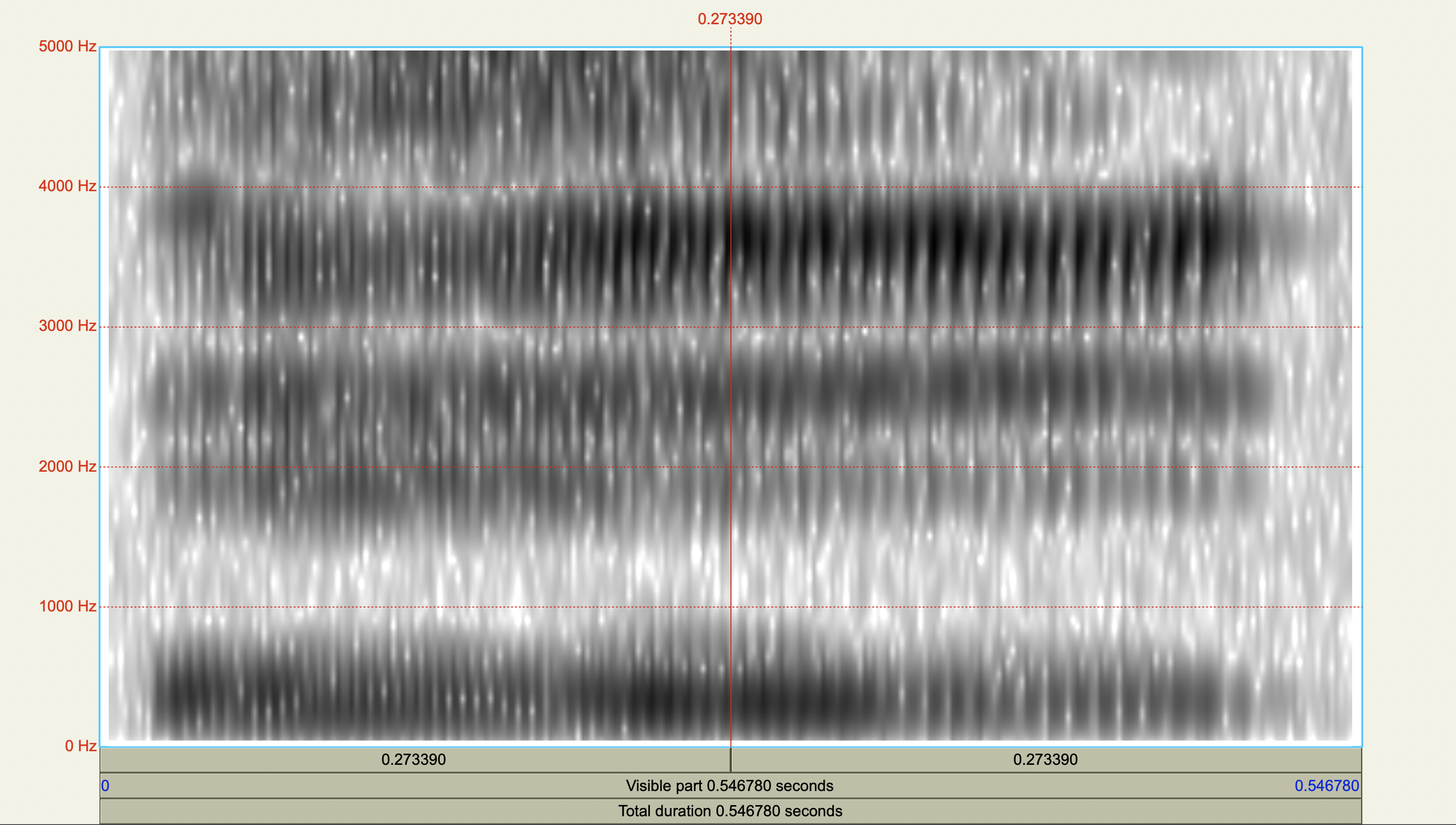
Spectrogram of [ɨ]

== Occurrence ==
/ɨ/ is uncommon as a phoneme in Indo-European languages, occurring most commonly in some Slavic languages, such as Belarusian and Russian (see ы). However, it is very common as a separate phoneme in the indigenous languages of the Americas and is often in phonemic contrast with other close vowels such as /i/ and /u/ both in modern living languages as well as reconstructed proto-languages (such as Proto-Uto-Aztecan). Campbell, Kaufman, and Smith-Stark identify the presence of this vowel phoneme as an areal feature of a Mesoamerican Sprachbund (although that is not a defining feature of the entire area).

Language		Word	IPA	Meaning	Notes
Acehnese		tupeue	[tupɨə]	'to know'	Asyik and Al-Ahmadi Al-Harbi describe this sound as such while Durie describes it as closer to [ɯ]
Aikanã		tɨi	[ˈtɨi]	'aunt'	It also happens as allophone of /a/ before [i].
Angami	Khonoma	prü	[pɻɨ˨]	'hail stone'	The height varies between close [ɨ] and mid [ə]. Typically transcribed in IPA with ⟨ə⟩.
Arhuaco		ikʉ	[ɪkʼɨ]	'Arhuaco language'	
Armenian	Meghri	ագարակ/agarak	[hɨˈgɛrak]	'farm'	
Bantawa	Ilam, Nepal	küma	[kɨma]	'afraid'	
Chinese	Hokkien	豬/tir	[tɨ˥]	'pig'	
Chinese	Mandarin	十/shí	[ʂɨ˧˥]	'ten'	Typically transcribed in IPA with ⟨ʐ̩⟩ or ⟨ɻ̍⟩.
English	Northern England	council	[ˈkaʊnsɨl]	'council'	Especially encountered in fast and casual speech. May be encountered in the Midlands to a lesser degree as well.
English	Southeastern	rude	[ɹɨːd]	'rude'	May be rounded [ʉː], or a diphthong [ʊʉ̯~əʉ̯] instead.
Guaraní		yvy	[ɨʋɨ]	'earth'	
Hausa		cin abinci	[t̠ʃin abɨnt̠ʃi]	'to eat'	Allophone of /i/.
Irish	Munster	caora	[kɨːɾˠə]	'sheep'	Allophone of /i/ between broad consonants. See Irish phonology
Kalagan		[pɨˈnɨt̪]		'beard'	
Kashmiri		ژٕنُن/cûnun	[t͡sɨnʊn]	'peach'	
Kera		[ɡɨ̀ɡɨ̀r]		'knee'	
Khmer		គិត/kīt	[kɨt]	'to think'	See Khmer phonology
Kurdish	Palewani (Southern)	کرماشان/kirmaşan	[cʰɨɾmäːʃäːn]	'Kermanshah'	Equal to Kurmanji and Sorani [ɪ]. See Kurdish phonology
Latgalian		dyžan	[ˈd̪ɨʒän̪]	'very much'	See Latgalian phonology
Malay	Kelantan-Pattani	ngecat	[ŋɨ.caʔ]	'to paint'	See Kelantan-Pattani Malay
Malayalam		ആട്/aadu	[aːɖɨ]	'goat'	See Malayalam phonology
Mongolian		хүчир/hučir	[xutʃʰɨɾɘ̆]	'difficult'	
Matis		[kɨˈnɨ]		'wall'	
Mono		dɨ	[dɨ]	'count'	
Mpade		sɨm	[sɨm]	'to eat'	
Norwegian		fin	[fɨ:n]	'nice'	Only dialects in Meldal and Gudbrandsdalen
Paicî					
Portuguese	Portugal	gente	[ʒẽtɨ]	'people'	Realization of unstressed "e".
Portuguese	Angola	gente	[ʒẽtɨ]	'people'	Realization of unstressed "e".
Portuguese	Mozambique	gente	[ʒẽtɨ]	'people'	Realization of unstressed "e".
Romanian		înot	[ɨˈn̪o̞t̪]	'I swim'	See Romanian phonology
Russian		ты/ty	[t̪ɨ]	'you' (singular/informal)	Occurs only after unpalatalized consonants. Near-close when unstressed. See Russian phonology
Sahaptin		kʼsit	[kʼsɨt]	'cold'	Epenthetic. No lengthened equivalent
Sanumá		[taˈaɨ]		'to see'	The nasal version [ɨ̃] also occurs.
Scottish Gaelic	Lewis	tuilleadh	[ˈt̪ʰɨʎəɣ]	'more'	Allophone of /ɯ/ when short and in proximity to slender consonants.
Shipibo		tenaitianronki	[ˈt̪ɨnɐi̞ti̞ɐ̃ɽõ̞ɣi̞]		Possible realization of /ɯ/ after coronal consonants.
Sirionó		[eˈsɨ]		'dry wood'	
Sundanese		anjeun	[and͡ʒɨn]	'you'	May be close back [ɯ], close-mid central [ɘ], or close-mid back [ɤ] by younger speakers.
Sümi		sü	[ʃɨ˩]	'to hurt'	Described variously as close [ɨ] and near-close [ɨ̞].
Swedish	Bohuslän	bli	[blɨːᶻ]	'to become'	A fricated vowel that corresponds to [iː] in Central Standard Swedish. See Swedish phonology
Swedish	Närke	bli	[blɨːᶻ]	'to become'	A fricated vowel that corresponds to [iː] in Central Standard Swedish. See Swedish phonology
Tajik	Bukharan	ғижғиж/cižciž	[ʁɨʑʁɨʑ]	'the sound of wood sawing'	Allophone of /i/ in the environment of uvular consonants.
Tamil		vály (வால்)	[väːlɨ]	'tail'	Epenthetic vowel inserted in colloquial speech after word-final liquids; can be rounded [ʉ] instead. See Tamil phonology
Tera		zu̱	[zɨ]	'said'	
Tsou		hahocngx, hahocngʉ	[ha.ˈho.t͡sŋɨ]	'man'	/ɨ/, with free variant [ʉ]. Used to be written as ⟨ʉ⟩, but changed to ⟨x⟩ for more convenient typing.
Tupi		ybytyra	[ɨβɨˈtɨɾa]	'mountain'	See Tupian Phonology
Turkish	Standard	sığ	[sɨː]	'shallow'	Also described as close back [ɯ] and near-close near-back [ɯ̽]. Typically transcribed in IPA with ⟨ɯ⟩. See Turkish phonology
Turkish	Balkans	eski	[es.'kɨ]	'old'	Word-final merger of standard Turkish sounds /i/ and /ɯ/, shift of /y/ and /u/ into single phoneme due to interactions caused by Balkan sprachbund. Dombrowski transcribes this phoneme as /i/.
Udmurt		yrgete/ыргетэ	[ɨrɡete]	'it growls'	
Vietnamese		bưng	[ʔɓɨŋ˧˧]	'to carry'	
Wayuu		paanüküin	[pa:nɨkɨinː]	'your mouth'	
Welsh	Northern dialects	llun	[ɬɨːn]	'picture'	Close when long. /ɨː/ merges with /iː/ in southern dialects. See Welsh phonology
Yaeyama		pïtu	[pɨtu]	'person'	
Zapotec	Tilquiapan	nɨ	[nɨ]	'be sour'	

The sound of Polish ⟨y⟩ is often represented as /ɨ/, but actually it is a close-mid advanced central unrounded vowel, more narrowly transcribed [ɘ̟]. Similarly, European Portuguese unstressed ⟨e⟩, often represented as /ɨ/, is actually a near-close near-back unrounded vowel, more narrowly transcribed using ad hoc symbols such as [ɯ̽] (mid-centralized), [ɯ̟] (fronted) and [ʊ̜] (less rounded, i.e. unrounded).

== Near-close central unrounded vowel ==
Near-close central unrounded vowel

ɨ̞

ɘ̝

ɪ̈

Audio sample
- source · help
Image

Some languages feature the near-close central unrounded vowel, which is slightly lower. It is most often transcribed in IPA with ⟨ɨ̞⟩ and ⟨ɪ̈⟩, but ⟨ɘ̝⟩ is also possible. In many British dictionaries, this vowel has been transcribed ⟨ɪ⟩, which captures its height; in the American tradition it is more often ⟨ɨ⟩, which captures its centrality, or ⟨ᵻ⟩, which captures both. ⟨ᵻ⟩ is also used in a number of other publications, such as Accents of English by John C. Wells. In the third edition of the Oxford English Dictionary, ⟨ᵻ⟩ represents variation between /ɪ/ and /ə/.

=== Features ===
- Its vowel height is near-close, also known as near-high, which means the tongue is not quite so constricted as a close vowel (high vowel).
- Its vowel backness is central, which means the tongue is positioned halfway between a front vowel and a back vowel.
- It is unrounded, which means that the lips are not rounded.

=== Occurrence ===
Language		Word	IPA	Meaning	Notes
Amharic		ሥር/sûr	[sɨ̞r]	'root'	Near-close.
Berber	Central Atlas Tamazight	ⵅⴷⵉⵎ/khdim	[χdɨ̞m]	'to work'	Epenthetically inserted into consonant clusters before labial and coronal consonants.
English	Inland Southern American	good	[ɡɨ̞d]	'good'	Corresponds to [ʊ] in other dialects. See English phonology
English	Southeastern English	good	[ɡɪ̈d]	'good'	May be rounded [ʊ̈] instead; it corresponds to [ʊ] in other dialects. See English phonology
English	London	lip	[lɪ̈ʔp]	'lip'	Possible realization of /ɪ/.
English	South African	lip	[lɨ̞p]	'lip'	For some speakers it can be equal to [ə]. General and Broad varieties of SAE have an allophonic variation, with [ɪ] ([i] in Broad) occurring near velar and palatal consonants, and [ɨ̞~ə] elsewhere. See South African English phonology
English	Southern American	lip	[lɪ̈p]	'lip'	Allophone of /ɪ/ before labial consonants, sometimes also in other environments.
Irish		goirt	[ɡɨ̞ɾˠtʲ]	'salty'	Allophone of /i/ between broad consonants. See Irish phonology
Irish	Ulster	saol	[sɨ̞l]	'life'	Allophone of /ɪ/. Near-close.
Mah Meri		[d͡ʑäbɨ̞ʔ͡k̚]		'to be drunk'	
Mapudungun		müṉa	[mɘ̝ˈn̪ɐ̝]	'male cousin on father's side'	Unstressed allophone of /ɘ/.
Tera		vu̱r	[vɨ̞r]	'to give'	Allophone of /ɨ/ in closed syllables.
Welsh	Northern dialects	pump	[pɨ̞mp]	'five'	Near-close when short. /ɨ̞/ merges with /ɪ/ in southern dialects. See Welsh phonology

== See also ==
- Index of phonetics articles

== Notes ==
Place →	Labial					Coronal										Dorsal					Laryngeal			
Manner ↓	Bilabial		Labiodental		Linguolabial		Dental		Alveolar		Postalveolar		Retroflex		(Alveolo-)palatal		Velar		Uvular		Pharyngeal/epiglottal		Glottal	
Nasal	m̥	m	ɱ̊	ɱ		n̼	n̪̊	n̪	n̥	n	n̠̊	n̠	ɳ̊	ɳ	ɲ̊	ɲ	ŋ̊	ŋ	ɴ̥	ɴ				
Plosive	p	b	p̪	b̪	t̼	d̼	t̪	d̪	t	d			ʈ	ɖ	c	ɟ	k	ɡ	q	ɢ	ʡ		ʔ	
Sibilant affricate							t̪s̪	d̪z̪	ts	dz	t̠ʃ	d̠ʒ	tʂ	dʐ	tɕ	dʑ								
Non-sibilant affricate	pɸ	bβ	p̪f	b̪v			t̪θ	d̪ð	tɹ̝̊	dɹ̝	t̠ɹ̠̊˔	d̠ɹ̠˔			cç	ɟʝ	kx	ɡɣ	qχ	ɢʁ	ʡʜ	ʡʢ	ʔh	
Sibilant fricative							s̪	z̪	s	z	ʃ	ʒ	ʂ	ʐ	ɕ	ʑ								
Non-sibilant fricative	ɸ	β	f	v	θ̼	ð̼	θ	ð	θ̠	ð̠	ɹ̠̊˔	ɹ̠˔	ɻ̊˔	ɻ˔	ç	ʝ	x	ɣ	χ	ʁ	ħ	ʕ	h	ɦ
Approximant		β̞		ʋ				ð̞		ɹ		ɹ̠		ɻ		j		ɰ						˷
Tap/flap		ⱱ̟		ⱱ					ɾ̥	ɾ			ɽ̊	ɽ						ɢ̆		ʡ̆		
Trill	ʙ̥	ʙ							r̥	r		r̠	ɽ̊r̥	ɽr					ʀ̥	ʀ	ʜ	ʢ		
Lateral affricate									tɬ	dɮ			tꞎ	d𝼅	c𝼆	ɟʎ̝	k𝼄	ɡʟ̝						
Lateral fricative							ɬ̪		ɬ	ɮ			ꞎ	𝼅	𝼆	ʎ̝	𝼄	ʟ̝						
Lateral approximant								l̪	l̥	l		l̠	ɭ̊	ɭ	ʎ̥	ʎ	ʟ̥	ʟ		ʟ̠				
Lateral tap/flap									ɺ̥	ɺ			𝼈̊	𝼈		ʎ̆		ʟ̆						

		BL	LD	D	A	PA	RF	P	V	U
Implosive	Voiced	ɓ			ɗ		ᶑ	ʄ	ɠ	ʛ
Implosive	Voiceless	ɓ̥			ɗ̥		ᶑ̊	ʄ̊	ɠ̊	ʛ̥
Ejective	Stop	pʼ			tʼ		ʈʼ	cʼ	kʼ	qʼ
Ejective	Affricate		p̪fʼ	t̪θʼ	tsʼ	t̠ʃʼ	tʂʼ	tɕʼ	kxʼ	qχʼ
Ejective	Fricative	ɸʼ	fʼ	θʼ	sʼ	ʃʼ	ʂʼ	ɕʼ	xʼ	χʼ
Ejective	Lateral affricate				tɬʼ			c𝼆ʼ	k𝼄ʼ	q𝼄ʼ
Ejective	Lateral fricative				ɬʼ					
Click (top: velar; bottom: uvular)	Tenuis	kʘ qʘ		kǀ qǀ	kǃ qǃ		k𝼊 q𝼊	kǂ qǂ		
Click (top: velar; bottom: uvular)	Voiced	ɡʘ ɢʘ		ɡǀ ɢǀ	ɡǃ ɢǃ		ɡ𝼊 ɢ𝼊	ɡǂ ɢǂ		
Click (top: velar; bottom: uvular)	Nasal	ŋʘ ɴʘ		ŋǀ ɴǀ	ŋǃ ɴǃ		ŋ𝼊 ɴ𝼊	ŋǂ ɴǂ	ʞ	
Click (top: velar; bottom: uvular)	Tenuis lateral				kǁ qǁ					
Click (top: velar; bottom: uvular)	Voiced lateral				ɡǁ ɢǁ					
Click (top: velar; bottom: uvular)	Nasal lateral				ŋǁ ɴǁ					
