= Latgalian phonology =

Phonology of the Latgalian language

Latgalian language is considered a Latvian language dialect by the Latvian government, others argue that it is an independent language.

== Vowels ==
Vowel phonemes of Latgalian
	Front		Central		Back	
	short	long	short	long	short	long
Close	i ⟨i⟩	iː ⟨ī⟩	(ɨ) ⟨y⟩		u ⟨u⟩	uː ⟨ū⟩
Mid	ɛ ⟨e⟩	(ɛː) ⟨ē⟩			ɔ ⟨o⟩	(ɔː) ⟨ō⟩
Open	æ ⟨e⟩	æː ⟨ē⟩	a ⟨a⟩	aː ⟨ā⟩		
Diphthongs	iɛ uɔ					

- [ɨ] occurs in complementary distribution with [i], so that they can be regarded as allophones of a single /i/ phoneme.
- Long /ɛː, ɔː/ are rare and occur only in interjections. The phonological long counterparts of the short /ɛ, ɔ/ are the diphthongs /iɛ, uɔ/.
- There are very few minimal pairs for the /ɛ–æ/ opposition. In some dialects, [æ] is simply an allophone of /ɛ/.
- /a, aː/ are phonetically central [ä, äː].
- Apart from [iɛ] and [uɔ], there are also vowel+glide sequences [ɛi̯, æi̯, ai̯, iu̯, ɨu̯, au̯], which are very common. Rarer sequences include [ui̯], [ɔi̯] and [ɔu̯], with the last one occurring only in onomatopoeias and loanwords. Phonemically, they are all sequences of two phonemes, rather than proper diphthongs. In some dialects, [iu̯] and [ɨu̯] fall together as [ɛu̯]. [au̯] can also merge with [ɔu̯] as [ɔu̯].

== Consonants ==
Consonant phonemes of Latgalian
		Labial (Note: /m, mʲ, p, pʲ, b, bʲ/ are bilabial, whereas /f, v, vʲ/ are labiodental.)		Dental/ Alveolar		Postalveolar/ Palatal		Velar	
		hard	soft	hard	soft	hard	soft (Note: The alveolo-palatals occur only in some non-standard dialects, with the fricatives /ɕ, ʑ/ being more common than the affricates /t͡ɕ, d͡ʑ/.)	hard	soft
Nasal		m	mʲ	n	nʲ				
Stop	voiceless	p	pʲ	t	tʲ			k	kʲ
Stop	voiced	b	bʲ	d	dʲ			ɡ	ɡʲ
Affricate	voiceless			t͡s	t͡sʲ	t͡ʃ	(t͡ɕ)		
Affricate	voiced			d͡z	d͡zʲ	d͡ʒ	(d͡ʑ)		
Fricative	voiceless	(f) (Note: /f/ occurs only in some loanwords, such as ortografeja transl. orthography. In other loanwords, it is replaced by /p/, as in kopejs transl. coffee.)		s	sʲ	ʃ	(ɕ)	(x) (Note: /x/ occurs only in some loanwords, such as tehnologeja transl. technology. In other loanwords, it is replaced by /k/, as in kokejs transl. hockey.)	
Fricative	voiced	v (Note: /v, vʲ/ are traditionally classified as approximants [ʋ, ʋʲ] which phonetically may be fricatives [v, vʲ].)	vʲ	z	zʲ	ʒ	(ʑ)		
Approximant		v	vʲ	l	lʲ	ɪ̯	(i̯) (Note: For the approximants /ɪ̯/ and /ʊ̯/ the contrast between their hard and soft versions is phonetically realized as a contrast between retraction and advancement. The "soft" counterparts of /ɪ̯/ and /ʊ̯/ are /i̯/ and /u̯/. Brejdak (2006, pp. 198–199) considers those to have phonemic status and argues that the contrast between them and the plain /ɪ̯/ and /ʊ̯/ corresponds to the soft/hard contrast. However, Nau (2011, p. 13) considers the phonemic status of /u̯/ and especially /i̯/ (which she transcribes with a non-IPA symbol ⟨jʲ⟩) as questionable. If the difference is considered to be allophonic, the resulting single palatal approximant can be transcribed with ⟨j⟩ and the corresponding labio-velar with ⟨w⟩. In this article, the difference is assumed to be phonemic.)	ʊ̯ (Note: /ʊ̯, u̯/ are labial-velar.)	(u̯)
Trill				r	(rʲ)				

== Accent ==
=== Stress ===
The stress is most often on the first syllable.

=== Tonal accents ===
There are two phonemic tonal accents in Latgalian, which appear only on long syllables, i.e. those with a long vowel, a diphthong, or a sequence of a short vowel and a sonorant. These are falling (also called level) and broken (also called sharp). However, there are only a handful of minimal (or near-minimal) pairs, such as [rɛ̀ɪ̯tʲ] 'swallow' and [rɛ̂ɪ̯t] 'tomorrow', both written reit.

Phonetically, both of the tonal accents are falling; the falling accent is realized as an even decrease in intensity and pitch, whereas the broken accent is realized as a sudden decrease in intensity and pitch.

== Bibliography ==
- Nau, Nicole (2011), A short grammar of Latgalian, Munich: Lincom Europa, ISBN 978-3-86288-055-3
- Brejdak, Anton (2006), латгальский язык [Latgalian language] (in Russian)
