= Voiced bilabial nasal =

Consonantal sound represented by ⟨m⟩ in IPA

m
- IPA number: 114

Audio sample
- source · help

Encoding
- Entity (decimal): &#109;
- Unicode (hex): U+006D
- X-SAMPA: m
- Braille: ⠍ (braille pattern dots-134)
Image

A voiced bilabial nasal is a type of consonantal sound which has been observed to occur in about 96% of spoken languages. The symbol in the International Phonetic Alphabet that represents this sound is ⟨m⟩. The bilabial nasal occurs in English, and it is the sound represented by "m" in map and rum. Very few languages (e.g. Wyandot) are known to lack this sound. A small number of languages have been observed to lack independent nasal phonemes altogether, such as Quileute, Makah, and Central Rotokas.

== Features ==
Sagittal section of a voiced bilabial nasal

Features of a voiced bilabial nasal:

- Its manner of articulation is occlusive, which means it is produced by obstructing airflow in the vocal tract. Because the consonant is also nasal, the blocked airflow is redirected through the nose.
- Its place of articulation is bilabial, which means it is articulated with both lips.
- Its phonation is voiced, which means the vocal cords vibrate during the articulation.
- It is a nasal consonant, which means air is exclusively allowed to escape through the nose for nasal stops; otherwise, in addition to through the mouth.
- Because the sound is not produced with airflow over the tongue, the median–lateral dichotomy does not apply.
- Its airstream mechanism is pulmonic, which means it is articulated by pushing air only with the intercostal muscles and abdominal muscles, as in most speech sounds.

== Occurrence ==
Occurrence of /m/ in several languages.
Language		Word	IPA	Meaning	Notes
ǃKung		m	[m]	'eat'	
Adyghe		мазэ / māză	[maːza]	'moon'	
Arabic	Standard	مركز (markaz)	[ˈmɑ̝ɾ.kæz]	'capital'	See Arabic phonology
Armenian	Eastern	մայր (mayr)	[mɑjɾ]	'mother'	
Assyrian		ܡܪܐ (mara)	[maːra]	'owner'	
Basque		maitatu	[majt̪at̪u]	'to love'	
Bengali		মাতা (mata)	[ˈmat̪aˑ]	'mother'	See Bengali phonology
Breton		mor	[mor]	'sea'	
Bulgarian		мъгла (mygla)	[mɐˈɡwa]	'fog'	
Burushaski		akhuruman	[akʰuruman]	'so many'	
Catalan		meu	[ˈmew]	'mine'	See Catalan phonology
Cherokee		ᎠᎹ (ama)	[ama˦]	'water'	
Cantonese		貓 / 猫 (māau)	[maːu̯˥]	'cat'	See Cantonese phonology
Chukchi		Mанэгран	[maneɣɻan]	'tent'	
Chuvash		манăн (manën)	[manən]	'my'	
Czech		muž	[muʃ]	'man'	See Czech phonology
Dutch		mond	[mɔnt]	'mouth'	See Dutch phonology
Dhivehi		mas	[mas̪]	'fish'	See Dhivehi phonology
English		map	[ˈmæpʰ]	'map'	See English phonology
Esperanto		mateno	[maˈteno]	'morning'	See Esperanto phonology
Estonian		madu	[ˈmɑtu̞]	'snake'	See Estonian phonology
Filipino		manok	[mɐˈnɔʔk]	'chicken'	See Filipino phonology
Finnish		mies	[ˈmie̞s̠]	'man'	See Finnish phonology
French		mère	[mɛːʁ]	'mother'	See French phonology
Georgian		სამი (sami)	[ˈsami̞]	'three'	See Georgian phonology
German		Maus	[maʊ̯s]	'mouse'	See Standard German phonology
Greek		μάζα (maza)	[ˈmaza]	'clump'	See Modern Greek phonology
Gujarati		મોર (mór)	[moːɾ]	'male peacock'	See Gujarati phonology
Hawaiian		maka	[maka]	'eye'	See Hawaiian phonology
Hmong	White Hmong	𖬒𖬶𖬦 (mov)	[mo˨˦]	'food' or 'rice'	
Hindi		मछली (machlī)	[mɐt͡ʃʰ.liː]	'honey'	See Hindi-Urdu phonology
Hebrew		אמא (ima)	[ˈʔimäʔ]	'mother'	See Modern Hebrew phonology
Hungarian		ma	[mɒ]	'today'	See Hungarian phonology
Indonesian		masuk	[ˈmäsʊʔ]	'enter'	
Italian		mamma	[ˈmamma]	'mommy'	See Italian phonology
Japanese		マーク (maku)	[mäkɯ]	'mark'	See Japanese phonology
Kabardian		мазэ (mazè)	[maːza]	'moon'	
Kagayanen		manang	[manaŋ]	'older sister'	
Kazakh		кеме / keme	[keme]	'ship'	See Kazakh phonology
Ket		qīm-n-diŋa	[qim n diŋa]	'woman'	See Ket language
Khmer		ខ្មែរ (khmae)	[kʰmae]	'Khmer'	See Khmer phonology
Korean		섬 / seom	[sʰʌ̹m]	'straw sack'	See Korean phonology
Kurukh		aḍḍō-mekhō	[aɖɖo mekʰo]	'cattle'	
Lak		лакку маз (lakku maz)	[lakːu maz]	'Lak'	See Lak language
Limburgish		de moan	[mɒ̌ːn]	'the moon'	See Limburgish#Phonology
Macedonian		мајка (majka)	[ˈmajka]	'mother'	See Macedonian phonology
Malay		malam	[mɐlɐm]	'night'	
Malayalam		കമ്മി (kammi)	[kɐmmi]	'shortage'	See Malayalam phonology
Maltese		mimmi	[mɪmːɪ]	'pupil'	
Mandarin		貓 / 猫 (māo)	[mɑʊ̯˥]	'cat'	See Mandarin phonology
Marathi		मन (mana)	[mʌ̝n]	'mind'	See Marathi phonology
Mutsun		muruṭ	[muɾuʈ]	'night'	
Nepali		आमा (āmā)	[ämä]	'mother'	See Nepali phonology
Norwegian		mamma	[ˈmɑ̂mːɑ]	'mom'	See Norwegian phonology
Ojibwe		ᐊᓈᒥᒻ (anaamim)	[ənaːˈmɪm]	'accuse'	See Ojibwe phonology
Odia		ମା (mä)	[mäː]	'mother'	
Persian		مادر (madär)	[mɒːˈdæːr]	'mother'	See Persian phonology
Pirahã		baíxi	[ˈmàí̯ʔì]	'parent'	allophone of /b/
Polish		masa	[ˈmäsä]	'mass'	See Polish phonology
Portuguese		mato	[ˈmatu]	'bush'	See Portuguese phonology
Punjabi		ਮੈਂ (mēm̐)	[mɛ̃ː]	'I'	
Sanskrit		अहम् (aham)	[ähäm]	'I'	See Sanskrit phonology
Serbo-Croatian		море / more	[môːɾɛ]	'sea'	See Serbo-Croatian phonology
Slovak		muž	[muʂ]	'man'	
Slovene		miš	[mîʃ]	'mouse'	
Spanish		mamar	[maˈmaɾ]	'to suckle'	See Spanish phonology
Swahili		miti	[ˈmiti]	'trees'	
Swedish		en mamma	[ˈmâmːa]	'a mom'	See Swedish phonology
Telugu		మబ్బు (mabbu)	[mabːu]	'cloud'	Occurs as allophone of anuswara when followed by retroflex stops
Thai		เมรุมาศ (merúmâat)	[meː˧ɾ̞u˦˥maːt̚˥˩]	'royal crematory structure'	See Thai phonology
Toki Pona		mama	[ˈmama]	'parent'	
Tsez		мец (mec)	[mɛ̝t͡s]	'tongue'	
Turkish		cuma	[d͡ʒumɑ̈ː]	'Friday'	See Turkish phonology
Ukrainian		молоко (moloko)	[moɫoˈkʊ̯ɔ]	'milk'	See Ukrainian phonology
Urdu		نعم (magar)	[məɣəɾ]	'house'	See Hindi-Urdu phonology
Uyghur		مەن (män)	[mæn]	'I'	
Uzbek		men	[men]	'I'	
Vietnamese		muối	[mwojˀ˧˥]	'salt'	See Vietnamese phonology
Welsh		mam	[mam]	'mother'	See Welsh phonology
West Frisian		mar	[mar]	'lake'	See West Frisian phonology
Yi		ꂷ (ma)	[ma˧]	'bamboo'	
Zapotec	Tilquiapan	man	[maŋ]	'animal'	

=== Palatalized ===
Occurrence of /mʲ/ in several languages.
Language		Word	IPA	Meaning	Notes
Bulgarian		мя́сто (mästo)	[mʲa̟sto]	'place'	Contrasts with /m/. See Bulgarian phonology
Irish		mé	[mʲeː]	'I'	Contrasts with /mˠ/. See Irish phonology
Kildin Saami		ме̄рр (mʹērr)	[mʲerː]	'sea'	Kildin Saami contrasts varieties of bilabial nasals in voicedness, length and palatalization.
Latgalian		miļti	[mʲilʲtʲi]	'flour'	Contrasts with /m/. See Latgalian phonology
Lithuanian		merkti	[ˈmʲæ̂ˑɾʲktʲɪ]	'to close one's eyes'	Contrasts with /m/. See Lithuanian phonology
Marshallese		emān	[ɛmʲænʲ]	'four'	Contrasts with /mˠ/.
Nenets	Tundra Nenets	мяˮ/ḿaq	[mʲɑ]	'tent'	Contrasts with /m/.
Nenets	Forest Nenets	миԓи		'lived'	Contrasts with /m/.
Russian		медь (měď)	[mʲetʲ]	'copper'	Contrasts with /m/. See Russian phonology
Veps		nem'	[nemʲ]	'peninsula'	Contrasts with /m/.

=== Velarized ===
Occurrence of /mˠ/ in several languages.
Language	Word	IPA	Meaning	Notes
Gilbertese	mwe	[mˠe]	'sleep'	Contrasts with /m/ and /mː/.
Irish	má	[mˠɑː]	'if'	Contrasts with /mʲ/. See Irish phonology
Lithuanian	mama	[ˈmˠɐmˠɐ]	'mom'	Transcribed /m/. Contrasts with /mʲ/. See Lithuanian phonology
Marshallese	m̧winam̧ōn	[mˠinʲɑmˠʌnʲ]	'caterpillar'	Contrasts with /mʲ/.
Russian	муж (muž)	[mˠuʂ]	'husband'	Broadly marked with either velarisation, uvularisation or pharyngealisation. Contrasts with palatalized version. See Russian phonology

== See also ==
- List of phonetics topics

== Notes ==
Place →	Labial					Coronal										Dorsal					Laryngeal			
Manner ↓	Bilabial		Labiodental		Linguolabial		Dental		Alveolar		Postalveolar		Retroflex		(Alveolo-)palatal		Velar		Uvular		Pharyngeal/epiglottal		Glottal	
Nasal	m̥	m	ɱ̊	ɱ		n̼	n̪̊	n̪	n̥	n	n̠̊	n̠	ɳ̊	ɳ	ɲ̊	ɲ	ŋ̊	ŋ	ɴ̥	ɴ				
Plosive	p	b	p̪	b̪	t̼	d̼	t̪	d̪	t	d			ʈ	ɖ	c	ɟ	k	ɡ	q	ɢ	ʡ		ʔ	
Sibilant affricate							t̪s̪	d̪z̪	ts	dz	t̠ʃ	d̠ʒ	tʂ	dʐ	tɕ	dʑ								
Non-sibilant affricate	pɸ	bβ	p̪f	b̪v			t̪θ	d̪ð	tɹ̝̊	dɹ̝	t̠ɹ̠̊˔	d̠ɹ̠˔			cç	ɟʝ	kx	ɡɣ	qχ	ɢʁ	ʡʜ	ʡʢ	ʔh	
Sibilant fricative							s̪	z̪	s	z	ʃ	ʒ	ʂ	ʐ	ɕ	ʑ								
Non-sibilant fricative	ɸ	β	f	v	θ̼	ð̼	θ	ð	θ̠	ð̠	ɹ̠̊˔	ɹ̠˔	ɻ̊˔	ɻ˔	ç	ʝ	x	ɣ	χ	ʁ	ħ	ʕ	h	ɦ
Approximant		β̞		ʋ				ð̞		ɹ		ɹ̠		ɻ		j		ɰ						˷
Tap/flap		ⱱ̟		ⱱ					ɾ̥	ɾ			ɽ̊	ɽ						ɢ̆		ʡ̆		
Trill	ʙ̥	ʙ							r̥	r		r̠	ɽ̊r̥	ɽr					ʀ̥	ʀ	ʜ	ʢ		
Lateral affricate									tɬ	dɮ			tꞎ	d𝼅	c𝼆	ɟʎ̝	k𝼄	ɡʟ̝						
Lateral fricative							ɬ̪		ɬ	ɮ			ꞎ	𝼅	𝼆	ʎ̝	𝼄	ʟ̝						
Lateral approximant								l̪	l̥	l		l̠	ɭ̊	ɭ	ʎ̥	ʎ	ʟ̥	ʟ		ʟ̠				
Lateral tap/flap									ɺ̥	ɺ			𝼈̊	𝼈		ʎ̆		ʟ̆						

		BL	LD	D	A	PA	RF	P	V	U
Implosive	Voiced	ɓ			ɗ		ᶑ	ʄ	ɠ	ʛ
Implosive	Voiceless	ɓ̥			ɗ̥		ᶑ̊	ʄ̊	ɠ̊	ʛ̥
Ejective	Stop	pʼ			tʼ		ʈʼ	cʼ	kʼ	qʼ
Ejective	Affricate		p̪fʼ	tθʼ	tsʼ	tʃʼ	tʂʼ	tɕʼ	kxʼ	qχʼ
Ejective	Fricative	ɸʼ	fʼ	θʼ	sʼ	ʃʼ	ʂʼ	ɕʼ	xʼ	χʼ
Ejective	Lateral affricate				tɬʼ			c𝼆ʼ	k𝼄ʼ	q𝼄ʼ
Ejective	Lateral fricative				ɬʼ					
Click (top: velar; bottom: uvular)	Tenuis	kʘ qʘ		kǀ qǀ	kǃ qǃ		k𝼊 q𝼊	kǂ qǂ		
Click (top: velar; bottom: uvular)	Voiced	ɡʘ ɢʘ		ɡǀ ɢǀ	ɡǃ ɢǃ		ɡ𝼊 ɢ𝼊	ɡǂ ɢǂ		
Click (top: velar; bottom: uvular)	Nasal	ŋʘ ɴʘ		ŋǀ ɴǀ	ŋǃ ɴǃ		ŋ𝼊 ɴ𝼊	ŋǂ ɴǂ	ʞ	
Click (top: velar; bottom: uvular)	Tenuis lateral				kǁ qǁ					
Click (top: velar; bottom: uvular)	Voiced lateral				ɡǁ ɢǁ					
Click (top: velar; bottom: uvular)	Nasal lateral				ŋǁ ɴǁ					
