= Pronunciation of English /r/ =

Overview of the English /r/

The pronunciation of the phoneme /r/ in the English language has many variations in different dialects.

== Variations ==
Depending on dialect, /r/ has at least the following allophones in varieties of English around the world:

- "Standard" R: postalveolar approximant [ɹ̠] (a common realization of the /r/ phoneme worldwide, Received Pronunciation and General American included).
  - "Bunched" or "Molar" R: velar bunched approximant (occurs in Southern American English and some Midwestern and Western American English most strongly); in fact, there is often a continuum of possible realizations for the postalveolar approximant within any single dialect from a more apical articulation to this more bunched articulation.
- "Velarized" R: velarized alveolar approximant [ɹˠ] (occurs in conservative Irish English)
- "Retroflex" R: retroflex approximant [ɻ] (occurs in West Country English, some American and Canadian English and Irish English, including Northern Irish English)
- "Flapped" or "Tapped" R: alveolar flap [ɾ] (occurs in Scouse and conservative Northern England English, most Scottish English, some South African, Welsh, Indian and Irish English—probably influenced by the native languages of those regions—and early twentieth-century Received Pronunciation; not to be confused with flapping of /t/ and /d/)
- "Trilled" or "Rolled" R: alveolar trill [r] (occurs in some very conservative Scottish English, South African English, some Welsh English, Indian English and Jersey English)
- "Uvular" R or "Northumbrian burr": voiced uvular fricative [ʁ] (occurs in very conservative varieties of Geordie and Northumbrian English, though largely now disappeared, as well as possibly some conservative South-West and East Irish English and some Aberdeen English)
- "Labial" or "Rounded" R: labiodental approximant [ʋ] (occurs in some South-East England and London English as a presumed idiosyncrasy, though this is disputed, as is its overlap with rhotacism; see § R-labialization below)

In most British dialects /r/ is labialized [ɹ̠ʷ] in many positions, as in reed [ɹ̠ʷiːd] and tree [tɹ̠̥ʷiː]; in the latter case, the /t/ may be slightly labialized as well.

In many dialects, /r/ in the cluster /dr/, as in dream, is realized as a postalveolar fricative [ɹ̠˔] or less commonly alveolar [ɹ̝]. In /tr/, as in tree, it is a voiceless postalveolar fricative [ɹ̠̊˔] or less commonly alveolar [ɹ̝̊]. In England, while the approximant has become the most common realization, /r/ may still be pronounced as a voiceless tap [ɾ̥] after /θ/ (as in thread). Tap realization of /r/ after /θ/ is also reported in some parts of the United States, particularly Utah.

There are two primary articulations of the approximant /r/: apical (with the tip of the tongue approaching the alveolar ridge or even curled back slightly) and domal (with a centralized bunching of the tongue known as molar r or sometimes bunched r or braced r). These articulations are perceptually indistinguishable and vary idiosyncratically between individuals. Peter Ladefoged wrote: "Many BBC English speakers have the tip of the tongue raised towards the roof of the mouth in the general location of the alveolar ridge, but many American English speakers simply bunch the body of the tongue up so that it is hard to say where the articulation is". The extIPA recommends the use of the IPA diacritics for "apical" and "centralized", as in ⟨ɹ̺, ɹ̈⟩, to distinguish apical and domal articulations in transcription.

== Rhoticity and non-rhoticity ==
English accents around the world are frequently characterized as either rhotic or non-rhotic. Most accents in England, Wales, Australia, New Zealand, and South Africa are non-rhotic accents, where the historical English phoneme /r/ is not pronounced unless followed by a vowel.

On the other hand, the historical /r/ is pronounced in all contexts in rhotic accents, which are spoken in most of Scotland, Ireland, the United States, Canada, and in some English accents (like in the West Country and some parts of Lancashire and the far north). Thus, a rhotic accent pronounces marker as /ˈmɑrkər/, and a non-rhotic accent pronounces the same word as /ˈmɑːkə/. In rhotic accents, when /r/ is not followed by a vowel phoneme, it generally surfaces as r-coloring of the preceding vowel or its coda: nurse [nɝs], butter [ˈbʌtɚ].

== R-labialization ==
R-labialization, which should not be confused with the rounding of initial /r/ described above, is a process occurring in certain dialects of English, particularly some varieties of Cockney, in which the /r/ phoneme is realized as a labiodental approximant [ʋ], in contrast to an alveolar approximant [ɹ].

The use of labiodental /r/ is commonly stigmatized by prescriptivists. However, its use is growing in many accents of British English. Most speakers who do so are from the South-East of England, particularly London.

That has also been reported to be an extremely rare realization of /r/ in New Zealand English and in the speech of younger speakers of Singapore English.

The /r/ realization may not always be labiodental since bilabial realizations have also been reported.

R-labialization leads to pronunciations such as these:

- red – [ʋɛd]
- ring – [ʋɪŋ]
- rabbit – [ˈʋæbɪt]
- Merry Christmas – [mɛʋi ˈkʋɪsməs]

However, the replacement of /r/ by some kind of labial approximant may also occur caused by a type of speech impediment called rhotacism or derhotacization.

== See also ==
- English-language vowel changes before historical /r/
- Rhoticity in English
