= Malayalam phonology =

Phonology of the Malayalam language

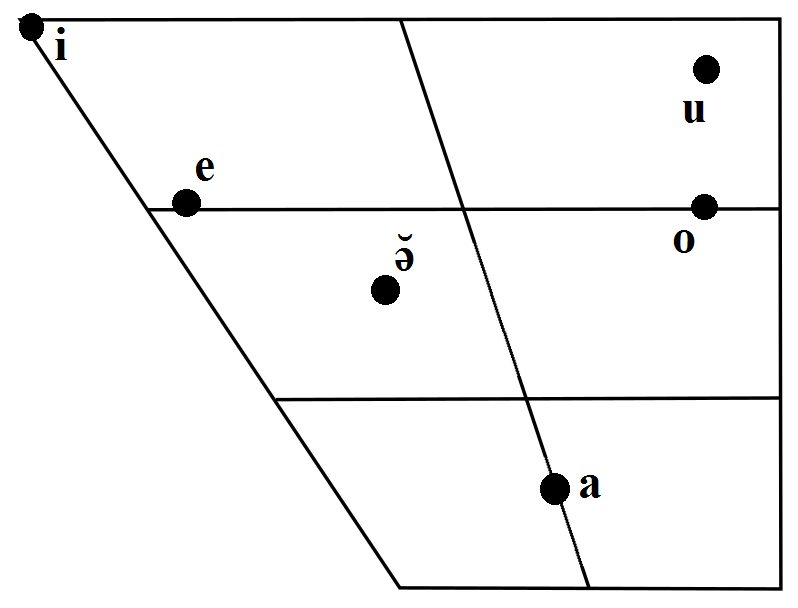
Monophthongs of Malayalam, from Namboodiripad, Savithry (2016)

Literary Malayalam

Malayalam phonology comprises the sound system of Malayalam. It is characterized by a large consonant inventory, including true subapical retroflexes and a phonemic distinction in vowel length. The language also maintains clear contrasts among dental, alveolar, and retroflex places of articulation.

For the consonants and vowels, the International Phonetic Alphabet (IPA) symbol is given, followed by the Malayalam character and the ISO 15919 transliteration. The current Malayalam script bears high similarity with Tigalari script, which was used for writing the Tulu language, spoken in coastal Karnataka (Dakshina Kannada and Udupi districts) and the northernmost Kasargod district of Kerala. Tigalari script was also used for writing Sanskrit in Malabar region.

== Vowels ==
The first letter in Malayalam

	Short			Long		
	Front	Central	Back	Front	Central	Back
Close	/i/ ഇ		/u/ ഉ	/iː/ ഈ		/uː/ ഊ
Mid	/e/ എ	/ə̆/ ്	/o/ ഒ	/eː/ ഏ		/oː/ ഓ
Open		/a/ അ			/aː/ ആ	

- ⟨്⟩ /ə̆/ [ə̆~ɤ̈̆] formed from word final short /u/'s, but now there are /u/'s finally as well, mostly in loanwords but also natively like in guru, kuru, puẓu and native pērŭ, there are minimal pairs as well: appŭ "water", appu a given name, naṭŭ "plant! (imperative)", naṭu "middle"; It is also added to the end of loanwords ending in some consonants, e.g. Sanskrit manas, āpad, Malayalam manassŭ, āpattŭ, English current Ml. karaṇṭŭ. In declensions the short u is deleted while the full u isn't, e.g. naṭŭ-illa, naṭu-illa > naṭilla, naṭuvilla. It is the saṁvr̥tōkāram, an epenthentic vowel in Malayalam. Therefore, it has no independent vowel letter (because it never occurs at the beginning of words) but, when it comes after a consonant, there are various ways of representing it. In medieval times, it was just represented with the symbol for /u/ ⟨കു⟩, but later on, it was just completely omitted (that is, written as an inherent vowel ⟨ക⟩, thus, ⟨പേര്⟩ pērŭ "name" was once written as ⟨പേര⟩ pēra which means "guava"). In modern times, it is written in two different ways – the Northern style, in which a chandrakkala is used ⟨ക്⟩, and the Southern or Travancore style, in which the diacritic for a /u/ is attached to the preceding consonant and a chandrakkala is written above ⟨കു്⟩. According to one author, this alternative form ⟨കു്⟩ is historically more correct, though the simplified form without a vowel sign u is common nowadays.
- /a/ (phonetically central: [ä]) is represented as basic or the "default" vowel in the abugida script.

Malayalam has also borrowed the Sanskrit diphthongs of /ai̯/ (represented in Malayalam as ഐ, ai) and /au̯/ (represented in Malayalam as ഔ, au) although these mostly occur only in Sanskrit loanwords. Traditionally (as in Sanskrit), four vocalic consonants (usually pronounced in Malayalam as consonants followed by the saṁvr̥tōkāram, which is not officially a vowel, and not as actual vocalic consonants) have been classified as vowels: vocalic r (ഋ, /rɨ̆/, r̥), long vocalic r (ൠ, /rɨː/, r̥̄), vocalic l (ഌ, /lɨ̆/, l̥) and long vocalic l (ൡ, /lɨː/, l̥̄). Except for the first, the other three have been omitted from the current script used in Kerala as there are no words in current Malayalam that use them.

Some authors say that Malayalam has no diphthongs and /ai̯, au̯/ are clusters of V+glide j/ʋ while others consider all V+glide clusters to be diphthongs /ai̯, aːi̯, au̯, ei̯, oi̯, i̯a/ as in kai, vāypa, auṣadhaṁ, cey, koy and kāryaṁ

Vowel length is phonemic and all of the vowels have minimal pairs; for example kaṭṭi "thickness", kāṭṭi "showed", koṭṭi "tapped", kōṭṭi "twisted, stick, marble", eṟi "throw", ēṟi "lots"

Vowels tend to be fronted around palatalized consonants and backed around velarized consonants.

Some speakers also have /æː/, /ɔː/, /ə/ from English loanwords; e.g. /bæːŋgɨ̆/ "bank" but most speakers replace it with /aː/, /eː/ or /ja/; /oː/ or /aː/ and /e/ or /a/.

== Consonants ==
		Labial	Dental	Alveolar	Retroflex	Postalveolar/ Palatal	Velar	Glottal
Nasal		m മ	n̪ ന	n ന / ഩ (Note: Obsolete)	ɳ ണ	ɲ ഞ	ŋ, (ŋʲ) ങ	
Plosive/ Affricate	voiceless	p പ	t̪ ത	t റ്റ	ʈ ട	t͡ɕ~t͡ʃ ച	k, (kʲ) ക	
Plosive/ Affricate	aspirated	pʰ ഫ	t̪ʰ ഥ		ʈʰ ഠ	t͡ɕʰ~t͡ʃʰ ഛ	kʰ ഖ	
Plosive/ Affricate	voiced	b ബ	d̪ ദ	(d) (Note: Only occurs after ṉ.) ന്റ	ɖ ഡ	d͡ʑ~d͡ʒ ജ	ɡ ഗ	
Plosive/ Affricate	breathy	bʱ ഭ	d̪ʱ ധ		ɖʱ ഢ	d͡ʑʱ~d͡ʒʱ ഝ	ɡʱ ഘ	
Fricative		f ഫ		s, (z) സ	ʂ ഷ	ɕ~ʃ ശ		h ഹ
Approx.	central	ʋ വ			ɻ ഴ (Note: Often transliterated as zh by Malayalis and Tamils, may also be transliterated as ẓ or r̤ by some others.)	j യ		
Approx.	lateral			l ല	ɭ ള			
Tap				ɾ ര				
Trill				r റ				

- As in other Dravidian languages, the retroflex series are true subapical consonants, in which the underside of the tongue contacts the roof.
- All of the alveolars except /s/ are apical.
- /ɕ ~ ʃ, t͡ɕ ~ t͡ʃ, t͡ɕʰ ~ t͡ʃʰ, d͡ʑ ~ d͡ʒ, d͡ʑʱ ~ d͡ʒʱ/ can either be postalveolar or alveolo-palatal depending upon the speaker and dialect; the postalveolar and alveolo-palatal realizations are in free variation.
- The alveolar nasal once had a separate character ⟨ഩ⟩ that is now obsolete and the sound is now almost always represented by the symbol that was originally used only for the dental nasal. However, both sounds are extensively used in current colloquial and official Malayalam, and although they were allophones in Old Malayalam, they now occasionally contrast in gemination – for example, eṉṉāl ('by me', first-person singular pronoun in the instrumental case) and ennāl ('if that is so'), which are both written ennāl (എന്നാൽ) and tiṉṉŭ "eat!", tinnŭ "ate".
- The unaspirated alveolar stop also had a separate character ⟨ഺ⟩ but it has become obsolete, as the sound only occurs in geminate form (when geminated it is written with a റ below another റ ⟨റ്റ⟩) or immediately following other consonants (in these cases, റ or ററ are usually written in small size underneath the first consonant).
- The proto Dravidian alveolar stop *ṯ developed into an alveolar trill /r/ in many of the Dravidian languages and *ṉṯ became nn in Malayalam while *ṯṯ remained. Currently Malayalam only has [nd] in the genitive case ending -ṉṟe and a word formed with it taṉṟēṭam; Malayalam regained it from the older genitive case ending -ṉuṭaiya > -ṉuṭe > -ṉṭe > -ṉṟe, Malayalam still retains both forms in words like eṉṉuṭe and eṉṟe though the former is dated, a similar process happened in some Sri Lankan Tamil dialects.
- ന്റ is pronounced as [nd] but ൻറ can be pronounced as [nd] or [nr]; [nr] doesn't occur natively, but it occurs in loans like എൻറോൾ (eṉṟōḷ) 'enroll' or ഹെൻറി (heṉṟi) 'Henry'.
- All non-geminated voiceless stops and affricate become voiced intervocalically and after a nasal as in Tamil.
- The geminated velars /kk/ and /ŋŋ/ are sometimes palatalized word medially after /j, i(:), e(:)/ like in the words കിടക്കുക [kiɖɐk:ugɐ] vs ഇരിക്കുക [iɾikʲ:ugɐ] and മങ്ങൽ [mɐŋ:ɐl] vs. മത്തങ്ങ [mɐt̪:ɐŋʲ:ɐ], their distribution is unpredictable e.g. it doesn't palatalize in vikkŭ but does in irikkŭ. If the palatalization is from /j/ it is sometimes deleted e.g. poykko can be [pojkʲːo] or [pokʲːo], aḍaykka as [ɐɖɐjkʲːɐ] or [ɐɖɐkʲːɐ]. Some of the northern dialects might pronounce them without palatalization.
- The letter ഫ represents both /pʰ/, a phoneme occurring in Sanskrit loanwords, and /f/, which is mostly found in comparatively recent borrowings from European languages. Though nowadays most people (especially youngsters) pronounce /pʰ/ as [f] like in the word phalam /fɐlɐm/. Medial /pʰ/ can be [f] or /b/ according to the speaker, eg. kapham /kɐfɐm/ or /kɐbɐm/ In the Jesari dialect the native word-initial /p/ is also spirantized to [f].
- /m, n, ɳ, l, ɭ/ are unreleased word finally. Words will never begin or end with a geminated consonant. All consonants appear word medially.
- The plain stops, affricates, nasals, laterals, the fricatives other than /h/ and /ʂ/ and approximants other than /ɻ/ can be geminated and gemination can sometimes change the meaning of the word, e.g. kaḷam 'cell', kaḷḷam 'lie'. /ɲ, ŋ, t/ only occur in geminated form intervocalically.
- The approximant /ɻ/ has both rhotic and lateral qualities, and is indeterminate between an approximant and a fricative. The articulation of /ɻ/ changes part-way through, perhaps explaining why it behaves as both a rhotic and a lateral, both an approximant and a fricative, but the nature of the change is not understood.
- /n, t, ɾ, l, ɻ/ are palatalized and have an advanced tongue root while /n̪, r, ɭ/ are clear or velarized and have a retracted tongue root, particularly noticeable in geminates. /ɾ, r/ can vary between ⟦ɹ̟ʲ ~ ɾ̟ʲ ~ r̟ʲ, ɾ̠ˠ ~ ṟˠ⟧.
- /ʋ/ may be realized as [ʋ], [v], [w] or [β̞].
- Around 75% of nk and 50% of ñc and nt from Old Malayalam got assimilated to ṅṅ, ññ and nn, almost all the ṉṯ merged with nn suggesting an earlier merger of some of the ṉṯ and nt (for e.g. the cognate of Tamil naṉṟi is spelt as nandi (influenced by Sanskrit nandi) and pronounced nanni); mp and ṇṭ were unchanged, e.g. Tamil mūṉṟu, maruntu, kañci, teṅku, but Malayalam mūnnŭ, marunnŭ, kaññi, teṅṅŭ. Word final ai, āy and ey became a unless the word is monosyllabic, e.g. Tamil avai, māṅgāy, veṇṇey but Malayalam ava, māṅṅa, veṇṇa. Final āy in monosyllabic words became āya e.g. Tamil kāy, but Malayalam kāya.
- Loanwords with /z/ are replaced with /s/ and not with /d͡ʒ/ like in Hindi or Telugu e.g. /brasi:l/ English "Brazil" unless it was loaned through Indo-Aryan then the Indo-Aryan pronunciation is taken e.g. /d͡ʒilla/ Hi. /d͡ʒilaː/ Per. /zilʔ/, other Perso-Arabic phonemes like /q, x, ɣ, ħ, Cˤ, ʕ, ʔ/ are replaced with /k, kʰ, g, h, C, ∅, ∅/, sometimes /q, x/ are replaced with /kʰ, k/ e.g. Arabic قطر qaṭar, خَطّ xaṭṭ became ഖത്തർ khattaṟ, കത്ത് kattŭ. English loans with /θ, ð, ʒ/ are replaced with /t̪, d̪, ʃ/; the dentals do not clash with English loans with /t, d/, which are replaced with [t, d] or [ʈ, ɖ], though [d] is rare because of the limited distribution natively e.g. "taxi" as ṯāksi or more commonly ṭāksi. The English /ɹ/ is loaned as either /ɾ/ or /r/ unpredictably, e.g. 'current' got loaned as karaṇḍŭ but 'maroon' got loaned as maṟūṇ or meṟūṇ but the cluster /ɹs/ is loaned as /ɻs/ other clusters are loaned as /rC/ or /ɾC/, /ɻ/ only occurs in words with /ɹs/ e.g. 'force' as fōḻsŭ. Speakers with non rhotic English accents don't have /ɹC/ clusters in English loans and pronounce it as fōs(ŭ). In Sanskrit, loans with /t̪C/ and /d̪C/ (unless C is a sonorant or a dental stop) sometimes the /t̪, d̪/ becomes /l/ especially in /t̪s/ e.g. utsava > ulsavam, utpādana > ulpādaṉam, udghāṭana > ulghāḍaṉam. There are some native words with /s/ (urasŭ), /ʃ/ (vīśŭ), /ʂ/ (muṣiyuka), /pʰ/ (apphan), /bʰ/ (ēbhyan), some interjections with /h/ (ōhō, āhā) but rest of the fricatives (except /f/ in native words of Jesari) and aspirates are only found in loans.
- Rarely, some speakers pronounce the voiced aspirated consonants as voiceless, so words like dhaṉam as thaṉam, it is more commonly deaspirated so dhaṉam as daṉam and kharam as karam, intervocalically the voiceless aspirate also becomes voiced so mukham as mogam.

== Colloquial and dialectal language ==
- i, u gets lowered to e, o when before Ca, eg. iṭam, mukham > eṭam, mogam, this change is seen in 10th century inscriptions, irunnaṭattu instead of irunniṭattu. Exceptions include ivan uḷḷa > ivan, oḷḷa (south), ŭḷḷa iḷḷa, eḷḷa, ḷḷa in other dialects. The latter word and uṇṭŭ have seen such variation since old Malayalam of the south. u can become ŭ sporadically in other dialects as with the previous word.
- Medial u's maybe pronounced as a kuttiyalugaram in the north and centre, in central it may even merge with a for some, eg. kaṟuppŭ > kaṟ(a)ppŭ, appuṟam > app(a)ṟam, taṇuttŭ > taṇ(a)ttŭ. In centre and north, ru can become ri when there is a non back vowel preceding it, e.g. ceruppŭ, irumpŭ, parutti, kurukkŭ > cerippŭ, irimpŭ, paritti, kurikkŭ. This change is also seen in the standard form.
- Sporadic cases of a > e, eg. laḍḍu, gaṅga, daśa, karayuka, raktam, raṇṭŭ, śani, bahu, jalam > leḍḍu, geṅṅa, deśa, kareyuka, rektam, reṇṭŭ, śeni, behu, jelam, but not in calam, śaśi or nagaram.
- Cases of aya, ava > ē, ō, most commonly in the north and in some castelects, ef. avaḷuṭe > ōḷṭe.
- A general feature is that the overall length of vowels decrease further north you go.
- In fast speech initial consonants may be dropped, e.g. ceytu koḷḷām > ceytōḷām; ḍraivŭ cey > ḍraivey; iṭṭu vaccu > iṭṭēccu; pōkuka vēṇam eṭā > pōkēṇam ḍā/pōkaṇam ḍa/pōṇōḍa; pōkuka vēṇṭā eṭī > pōkēṇṭā ḍī/pōkaṇṭa ḍi/pōṇḍṟi; paḻam āyi > paḻōy; pōyi koḷḷuka vēṇam > poykkōḷaṇam > pokkyōṇam.
- l, ḷ, ḻ dropped in coda, eg. tāḻttŭ, vilkkŭ, ñaṅṅaḷuṭe (>ñaṅṅaḷṭe), taṇṇīrmattaṉ, ippōḷ > tāttŭ, vikkŭ, ñaṅṅaṭe, taṇṇimattaṉ, ippō. Northern and Southern dialects might hypercorrect the last and similar words to ippam. Word finally it happens only if the next word starts with a consonant.
- Medial k maybe lenited to a fricative or completely lost in center and north, e.g. varukayilla > SK. varilla, NK. CK. varūla; pōkunnŭ > CK. pōṇŭ.
- ḻ merged with y in certain Mappila and castelects, eg. paḻam > payam. Judeo-Malayalam used to made them t Intervocalically and s before another t, there are also cases of hypercorrection like kaḻa < katha, but they are only attested in writing and was not present during aliyah. This was also done by certain northern Thiyya speakers affirming the affinity of Judeo Malayalam and northern Malayalam.
- More cases of nasal assimilation, eg. candaṉam, bhaṅgi, vēṇṭum > cannaṉam, baṅṅi, vēṇam. In some dialects neñcŭ, kuṭumbam > neññŭ, kuṭummam.
- Loss of aspiration, eg. dhaṉam, mukham > daṉam, mogam/mōm.
- śc > śś, sometimes cc too, eg. niścayam, talaccēri > niśśayam, talaśśēri.
- Merger of v with b farther north and sporadically in center, particularly among Mappila speech, e.g. vā, vēṇam > bā, bēṇam. In some areas like Malappuram it's merged with m instead, so vēṇam > mēṇam.

== Sample text ==
The following text is Article 1 of the Universal Declaration of Human Rights.

=== English ===
All human beings are born free and equal in dignity and rights. They are endowed with reason and conscience and should act towards one another in a spirit of brotherhood.

=== Malayalam ===
മനുഷ്യരെല്ലാവരും തുല്യാവകാശങ്ങളോടും അന്തസ്സോടും സ്വാതന്ത്ര്യത്തോടുംകൂടി ജനിച്ചിട്ടുള്ളവരാണ്‌. അന്യോന്യം ഭ്രാതൃഭാവത്തോടെ പെരുമാറുവാനാണ്‌ മനുഷ്യന് വിവേകബുദ്ധിയും മനസാക്ഷിയും സിദ്ധമായിരിക്കുന്നത്‌.

=== Romanisation (ISO 15919) ===
manuṣyarellāvaruṁ tulyāvakāśaṅṅaḷōṭuṁ antassōṭuṁ svātantryattōṭuṅkūṭi janicciṭṭuḷḷavarāṇ‌ŭ. anyōnyaṁ bhrātr̥bhāvattōṭe perumāṟuvānāṇ‌ŭ manuṣyanŭ vivēkabuddhiyuṁ manasākṣiyuṁ siddhamāyirikkunnat‌ŭ.

=== IPA ===
/manuʂjaɾellaːʋaɾum t̪uljaːʋakaːʃaŋŋaɭoːʈum an̪t̪assoːʈum sʋaːt̪an̪t̪rjat̪t̪oːʈuŋkuːʈi d͡ʒanit͡ʃt͡ʃiʈʈuɭɭaʋaɾaːɳɨ̆ ǁ anjoːnjam bʱraːt̪rɨ̆bʱaːʋat̪t̪oːʈe peɾumaːruʋaːnaːɳɨ̆ manuʂjanɨ̆ ʋiʋeːkabud̪d̪ʱijum manasaːkʂijum sid̪d̪ʱamaːjiɾikkun̪ːat̪ɨ̆ ǁ/
