= Voiced labiodental approximant =

Consonantal sound represented by ⟨ʋ⟩ in IPA

ʋ
- IPA number: 150

Audio sample
- source · help

Encoding
- Entity (decimal): &#651;
- Unicode (hex): U+028B
- X-SAMPA: P or v\
- Braille: ⠦ (braille pattern dots-236) ⠧ (braille pattern dots-1236)
Image

A voiced labiodental approximant is a type of consonantal sound, used in some spoken languages. It is something between an English /w/ and /v/, pronounced with the teeth and lips held in the position used to articulate the letter V. The symbol in the International Phonetic Alphabet that represents this sound is ⟨ʋ⟩, a letter v with a leftward hook protruding from the upper right of the letter. In some sources, this letter indicates a bilabial approximant, though this is more accurately transcribed with an advanced diacritic, ⟨ʋ̟⟩.

A labiodental approximant is the typical realization of /v/ in the Indian South African variety of English. As the voiceless /f/ is also realized as an approximant [ʋ̥], it is also an example of a language contrasting voiceless and voiced labiodental approximants.

== Features ==
Features of a voiced labiodental approximant:

- Its manner of articulation is approximant, which means it is produced by narrowing the vocal tract at the place of articulation, but not enough to produce a turbulent airstream.
- Its place of articulation is labiodental, which means it is articulated with the lower lip and the upper teeth.
- Its phonation is voiced, which means the vocal cords vibrate during the articulation.
- It is an oral consonant, which means that air is not allowed to escape through the nose.
- Because the sound is not produced with airflow over the tongue, the median–lateral dichotomy does not apply.
- Its airstream mechanism is pulmonic, which means it is articulated by pushing air only with the intercostal muscles and abdominal muscles, as in most speech sounds.

== Occurrence ==
| Language | | Word | IPA | Meaning | Notes |
|---|---|---|---|---|---|
| Äiwoo | | nyiveli | [ɲiʋeli] | 'garden land' | |
| Armenian | Eastern | ոսկի | [ʋɔski] | 'gold' | |
| Assyrian | | ܗܘܐ / hawa | [hɑːʋɑ] | 'wind' | Predominant in the Urmia dialects. For some speakers, [v] is used. Corresponds to [w] in the other varieties. |
| Catalan | Balearic | fava | [ˈfäʋə] | 'bean' | Allophone of /v/. See Catalan phonology |
| Catalan | Valencian | fava | [ˈfäʋɐ] | 'bean' | Allophone of /v/. See Catalan phonology |
| Chinese | Mandarin | 為 为 / wèi | [we̞i] [ʋêi] | 'for' | Prevalent in northern dialects. Corresponds to /w/ in other varieties. See Mandarin Phonology |
| Chuvash | | аван | [aʋˈan] | 'good, well' | Corresponds to /w/ in other varieties. |
| Dhivehi | | ވަޅު / valhu | [ʋaɭu] | 'well' (noun) | See Dhivehi Phonology |
| Danish | Standard | véd | [ʋe̝ːˀð̠˕ˠ] | 'know(s)' | Realization of the phoneme /v/; may also be realized as [ʊ̯]. See Danish phonology |
| Dutch | Standard | wang | [ʋɑŋ] | 'cheek' | Realised as bilabial in southern european dialects [β̞]. See Dutch phonology |
| English | Indian | vine | [ʋaɪ̯n] | 'vine' | Corresponds to a fricative [v] in other accents. |
| English | Some Cockney speakers | rine | [ʋaɪ̯n] | 'rine' | Mostly idiosyncratic but somewhat dialectal (especially in London and South East England). See English phonology and R-labialization |
| Faroese | | røða | [ˈɹøːʋa] | 'speech' | Word-initial and intervocalic allophone of /v/. In the first case, it is in a free variation with a fricative [v]. See Faroese phonology |
| Finnish | | vauva | [ˈʋɑu̯ʋɑ] | 'baby' | See Finnish phonology |
| German | Swiss | was | [ʋas] | 'what' | Corresponds to /v/ in Standard German. |
| Guaraní | | avañe'ẽ | [ʔãʋ̃ãɲẽˈʔẽ] | 'Guaraní language' | Contrasts with /w/ and /ɰ/ |
| Hawaiian | | wikiwiki | [ʋikiʋiki] | 'fast' | May also be realized as [w] or [v]. See Hawaiian phonology |
| Hindustani | Hindi | वाला | [ʋɑːlɑː] | (the) 'one' | May also be realized as [w] or [v]. See Hindustani phonology. |
| Hindustani | Urdu | والا | [ʋɑːlɑː] | (the) 'one' | May also be realized as [w] or [v]. See Hindustani phonology. |
| Italian | Some speakers | raro | [ˈʋäːʋo] | 'rare' | Rendition alternative to the standard Italian alveolar trill [r], due to individual orthoepic defects and/or regional variations that make the alternative sound more prevalent, notably in South Tyrol (among the Italian-speaking minority), Val d'Aosta (bordering with France) and in parts of the Parma province, more markedly around Fidenza. Other alternative sounds may be a uvular trill [ʀ] or a voiced uvular fricative [ʁ]. See Italian phonology. |
| Icelandic | | lofa | [lo̝͡ɔ(ː)ʋä] | 'intr. to promise/ tr. to praise' | Weakly articulated, traditionally described as a fricative /v/ (which it is in free variation with). See Icelandic phonology |
| Lao | | ວີ / wi | [ʋíː] | 'hand fan' | May also be realized as [w]. See Lao phonology. |
| Khmer | | អាវុធ / avŭth | [ʔɑːʋut] | 'weapon' | See Khmer phonology |
| Malayalam | | വല/vala | [ʋɐlɐ] | 'net' | See Malayalam phonology |
| Marathi | | वजन | [ʋə(d)zən] | 'weight' | See Marathi phonology |
| Miyako | | [ʋ̩tɑ] | | 'thick' | May be syllabic. |
| Norwegian | Urban East | [a] verbo | [ˈʋæ̀ɾbǒ] | 'verb's principal parts' | Sometimes realized as a fricative [v]. See Norwegian phonology |
| Nsenga | | ŵanthu | [ʋaⁿtʰu] | 'people' | |
| Punjabi | Gurmukhi | ਵਾਲ | [ʋäːl] | 'hair' | Also an allophone of /v/ and /w/. |
| Punjabi | Shahmukhi | وال | [ʋäːl] | 'hair' | Also an allophone of /v/ and /w/. |
| Russian | | вода | [ʋʷɐˈdä] | 'water' | Common realization of /v/; contrasts with palatalized form. See Russian phonology |
| Serbo-Croatian | | ветар / vetar | [ˈʋɛ́tɐ̀r] | 'wind' | /v/ is a phonetic fricative, although it has less frication than /f/. However, it does not interact with unvoiced consonants in clusters as a fricative would, and so is considered to be phonologically a sonorant (approximant). See Serbo-Croatian Phonology |
| Shona | | vanhu | [ʋan̤u] | 'people' | Contrasts with /v/ and /w/. |
| Sinhala | | වතුර | [ʋat̪urə] | 'water' | |
| Slovak | | vietor | [ˈʋi̯e̞tɔr] | 'wind' | Usual realization of /v/. See Slovak phonology |
| Slovene | | veter | [ˈʋéːt̪ə̀ɾ] | 'wind' | Also described as fricative [v]. See Slovene phonology |
| Spanish | Chilean | hablar | [äʋˈläɾ] | 'to speak' | Allophone of /b/. See Spanish phonology |
| Swedish | Some speakers | valvet | [ˈʋal̪ˑ˨˥˩ʋɛt̪] | 'the vault' | See Swedish phonology |
| Tamil | | வாய் | [ʋɑːj] | 'mouth' | See Tamil phonology |
| Telugu | | వల | [ʋala] | 'net' | |
| Ukrainian | | Барвінкове | [bɐɾˈʋʲinko̞βe̞] | 'Barvinkove' | Possible prevocalic realization of /w/, most commonly before /i/. See Ukrainian phonology |
| West Frisian | | wêr | [ʋɛːr] | 'where' | See West Frisian phonology |

== See also ==
- List of phonetics topics
- R-labialization
- Rhotacism (speech impediment): pronouncing ⟨r⟩ as [ʋ]

== Bibliography ==
- Árnason, Kristján (2011), The Phonology of Icelandic and Faroese, Oxford University Press, ISBN 978-0199229314
- Basbøll, Hans (2005), The Phonology of Danish, Taylor & Francis, ISBN 0-203-97876-5
- Canepari, Luciano (1999) [1992], Il MªPi – Manuale di pronuncia italiana [Handbook of Italian Pronunciation] (in Italian) (2 ed.), Bologna: Zanichelli, ISBN 88-08-24624-8
- Dum-Tragut, Jasmine (2009), Armenian: Modern Eastern Armenian, Amsterdam: John Benjamins Publishing Company
- Foulkes, Paul; Docherty, Gerard J., eds. (1999), Urban Voices, Arnold
- Greenberg, Mark L. (2006), A Short Reference Grammar of Standard Slovene, Kansas: University of Kansas
- Hanulíková, Adriana; Hamann, Silke (2010), "Slovak" (PDF), Journal of the International Phonetic Association, 40 (3): 373–378, doi:10.1017/S0025100310000162
- Helgason, Pétur (1991), On Coarticulation and Connected Speech Processes in Icelandic (MA thesis), University of Reading
- Kristoffersen, Gjert (2000), The Phonology of Norwegian, Oxford University Press, ISBN 978-0-19-823765-5
- Mesthrie, Rajend (2004), "Indian South African English: phonology", in Schneider, Edgar W.; Burridge, Kate; Kortmann, Bernd; Mesthrie, Rajend; Upton, Clive (eds.), A handbook of varieties of English, vol. 1: Phonology, Mouton de Gruyter, pp. 953–963, ISBN 3-11-017532-0
- Morén, Bruce (2005), Consonant-Vowel Interactions in Serbian: Features, Representations and Constraint Interactions (PDF), Center for Advanced Study of Theoretical Linguistics, Tromsø, archived from the original (PDF) on 4 May 2015
- Priestley, T.M.S. (2002), "Slovene", in Comrie, Bernard; Corbett, Greville. G. (eds.), The Slavonic Languages, London: Routledge, pp. 388–451, ISBN 0-415-28078-8
- Saborit Vilar, Josep (2009), Millorem la pronúncia, Acadèmia Valenciana de la Llengua
- Šuštaršič, Rastislav; Komar, Smiljana; Petek, Bojan (1999), "Slovene", Handbook of the International Phonetic Association: A guide to the use of the International Phonetic Alphabet, Cambridge: Cambridge University Press, pp. 135–139, doi:10.1017/S0025100300004874, ISBN 0-521-65236-7, S2CID 249404451
- Vanvik, Arne (1979), Norsk fonetikk, Oslo: Universitetet i Oslo, ISBN 82-990584-0-6
- Yanushevskaya, Irena; Bunčić, Daniel (2015), "Russian" (PDF), Journal of the International Phonetic Association, 45 (2): 221–228, doi:10.1017/S0025100314000395
- Žovtobrjux, M.A.; Kulyk, B.M. (1965), Kurs sučasnoji ukrajins'koji literaturnoji movy. Častyna I., Kiev: Radjans’ka škola

| Place → | Labial | | | | | Coronal | | | | | | | | | | Dorsal | | | | | Laryngeal | | | |
| Manner ↓ | Bilabial | | Labiodental | | Linguolabial | | Dental | | Alveolar | | Postalveolar | | Retroflex | | (Alveolo-)palatal | | Velar | | Uvular | | Pharyngeal/epiglottal | | Glottal | |
|---|---|---|---|---|---|---|---|---|---|---|---|---|---|---|---|---|---|---|---|---|---|---|---|---|
| Nasal | m̥ | m | ɱ̊ | ɱ | | n̼ | n̪̊ | n̪ | n̥ | n | n̠̊ | n̠ | ɳ̊ | ɳ | ɲ̊ | ɲ | ŋ̊ | ŋ | ɴ̥ | ɴ | | | | |
| Plosive | p | b | p̪ | b̪ | t̼ | d̼ | t̪ | d̪ | t | d | | | ʈ | ɖ | c | ɟ | k | ɡ | q | ɢ | ʡ | | ʔ | |
| Sibilant affricate | | | | | | | t̪s̪ | d̪z̪ | ts | dz | t̠ʃ | d̠ʒ | tʂ | dʐ | tɕ | dʑ | | | | | | | | |
| Non-sibilant affricate | pɸ | bβ | p̪f | b̪v | | | t̪θ | d̪ð | tɹ̝̊ | dɹ̝ | t̠ɹ̠̊˔ | d̠ɹ̠˔ | | | cç | ɟʝ | kx | ɡɣ | qχ | ɢʁ | ʡʜ | ʡʢ | ʔh | |
| Sibilant fricative | | | | | | | s̪ | z̪ | s | z | ʃ | ʒ | ʂ | ʐ | ɕ | ʑ | | | | | | | | |
| Non-sibilant fricative | ɸ | β | f | v | θ̼ | ð̼ | θ | ð | θ̠ | ð̠ | ɹ̠̊˔ | ɹ̠˔ | ɻ̊˔ | ɻ˔ | ç | ʝ | x | ɣ | χ | ʁ | ħ | ʕ | h | ɦ |
| Approximant | | β̞ | | ʋ | | | | ð̞ | | ɹ | | ɹ̠ | | ɻ | | j | | ɰ | | | | | | ˷ |
| Tap/flap | | ⱱ̟ | | ⱱ | | | | | ɾ̥ | ɾ | | | ɽ̊ | ɽ | | | | | | ɢ̆ | | ʡ̆ | | |
| Trill | ʙ̥ | ʙ | | | | | | | r̥ | r | | r̠ | ɽ̊r̥ | ɽr | | | | | ʀ̥ | ʀ | ʜ | ʢ | | |
| Lateral affricate | | | | | | | | | tɬ | dɮ | | | tꞎ | d𝼅 | c𝼆 | ɟʎ̝ | k𝼄 | ɡʟ̝ | | | | | | |
| Lateral fricative | | | | | | | ɬ̪ | | ɬ | ɮ | | | ꞎ | 𝼅 | 𝼆 | ʎ̝ | 𝼄 | ʟ̝ | | | | | | |
| Lateral approximant | | | | | | | | l̪ | l̥ | l | | l̠ | ɭ̊ | ɭ | ʎ̥ | ʎ | ʟ̥ | ʟ | | ʟ̠ | | | | |
| Lateral tap/flap | | | | | | | | | ɺ̥ | ɺ | | | 𝼈̊ | 𝼈 | | ʎ̆ | | ʟ̆ | | | | | | |

| | | BL | LD | D | A | PA | RF | P | V | U |
|---|---|---|---|---|---|---|---|---|---|---|
| Implosive | Voiced | ɓ | | | ɗ | | ᶑ | ʄ | ɠ | ʛ |
| Implosive | Voiceless | ɓ̥ | | | ɗ̥ | | ᶑ̊ | ʄ̊ | ɠ̊ | ʛ̥ |
| Ejective | Stop | pʼ | | | tʼ | | ʈʼ | cʼ | kʼ | qʼ |
| Ejective | Affricate | | p̪fʼ | tθʼ | tsʼ | tʃʼ | tʂʼ | tɕʼ | kxʼ | qχʼ |
| Ejective | Fricative | ɸʼ | fʼ | θʼ | sʼ | ʃʼ | ʂʼ | ɕʼ | xʼ | χʼ |
| Ejective | Lateral affricate | | | | tɬʼ | | | c𝼆ʼ | k𝼄ʼ | q𝼄ʼ |
| Ejective | Lateral fricative | | | | ɬʼ | | | | | |
| Click (top: velar; bottom: uvular) | Tenuis | kʘ qʘ | | kǀ qǀ | kǃ qǃ | | k𝼊 q𝼊 | kǂ qǂ | | |
| Click (top: velar; bottom: uvular) | Voiced | ɡʘ ɢʘ | | ɡǀ ɢǀ | ɡǃ ɢǃ | | ɡ𝼊 ɢ𝼊 | ɡǂ ɢǂ | | |
| Click (top: velar; bottom: uvular) | Nasal | ŋʘ ɴʘ | | ŋǀ ɴǀ | ŋǃ ɴǃ | | ŋ𝼊 ɴ𝼊 | ŋǂ ɴǂ | ʞ | |
| Click (top: velar; bottom: uvular) | Tenuis lateral | | | | kǁ qǁ | | | | | |
| Click (top: velar; bottom: uvular) | Voiced lateral | | | | ɡǁ ɢǁ | | | | | |
| Click (top: velar; bottom: uvular) | Nasal lateral | | | | ŋǁ ɴǁ | | | | | |
