= Maldivian phonology =

Sounds and pronunciation of the Maldivian language

The phonemic inventory of Maldivian (Dhivehi) consists of 29 consonants and 10 vowels. Like other modern Indo-Aryan languages the Maldivian phonemic inventory shows an opposition of long and short vowels, of dental and retroflex consonants as well as single and geminate consonants.

== Vowels ==
=== Vowels ===
Vowels
	Front		Central		Back	
	short	long	short	long	short	long
Close	i	iː			u	uː
Mid	e	eː			o	oː
Open		(æː)	a	aː		

- The diphthongs /ai̯ au̯ oi̯/ are realized [æː aː oe] in Malé. However, this does not apply to unassimilated loanwords.

== Consonants ==
Consonants
		Labial	Dental/ Alveolar	Retroflex	Palatal	Velar	Glottal
Nasal		m	n	(ɳ)	(ɲ)		
Plosive/ Affricate	voiceless	p	t̪	ʈ	t͡ʃ	k	
Plosive/ Affricate	voiced	b	d̪	ɖ	d͡ʒ	ɡ	
Plosive/ Affricate	prenasal	ᵐb	ⁿd̪	ᶯɖ		ᵑɡ	
Fricative	voiceless	f	s̪	ʂ	(ʃ)		h
Fricative	voiced	v ~ ʋ	z				
Approximant		v ~ ʋ	l̪	ɭ	j	(w)	
Tap				ɽ			

- /ɳ/ has merged with /n/ in the standard language, but it is still distinct in southern dialects.
- The status of /ɲ/ as a phoneme is unclear. Except for two words, /ɲamɲam/ cynometra cauliflora (a kind of fruit) and /ɲaʋijani/ 'Gnaviyani' (alphabet letter), the /ɲ/ only occurs as the result of the fusion of /n/ and /i/: /du:ni/ 'bird', /du:ɲɲeʔ/ 'a bird'.
- /ʃ/ is a loan phoneme primarily from Arabic (see section below)
- /ʋ/ can occasionally be heard as a fricative [v], it has a [w] allophone occurring between /a/ and /u/.

Dental and retroflex plosives are contrastive in Maldivian, e.g. /maɖun/ 'quietly', /madun/ 'seldom'.

- /t d/ are articulated just behind the front teeth.
- /ʈ ɖ ʂ ɭ/ are not truly retroflex, but apical, produced at the very rear part of the alveolar ridge.

/ᵐb ⁿd ᶯɖ ᵑɡ/ occur only intervocalically, e.g. /haⁿdu/ ''moon'', /haᶯɖuː/ ''uncooked rice'', /aᵑɡa/ ''mouth''. Maldivian and Sinhalese are the only Indo-Aryan languages that have prenasalized stops.

The influence of other languages has played a great role in Maldivian phonology. For example, the phoneme /z/ comes entirely from foreign influence: /ɡaːziː/ ('judge') is from Persian, /maːziː/ ('past') is from Urdu.

The phoneme /p/ also occurs only in borrowed words in Modern Standard Maldivian: /ripoːtu/ ('report'). At one point, Maldivian did not have the phoneme /f/, and /p/ occurred in the language without contrastive aspiration. Some time in the 17th century, word initial and intervocalic /p/ changed to /f/. Historical documents from the 11th century, for example, show 'five' rendered as /pas̪/ whereas today it is pronounced /fas̪/.

In standard Maldivian when the phoneme /s/ occurs in the final position of a word it changes to [h] intervocalically when inflected. For example, /bas̪/ ('word' or 'language') becomes /baheʔ/ ('a word' or 'a language') and /mas/ ('fish') becomes /maheʔ/ ('a fish'). /s/ and /h/ are still contrastive, though: initially /hiᵑɡaː/ ('operating') and /siŋɡaː/ ('lion') and intervocalically /aharu/ ('year') and /asaru/ ('effect').

/ʂ/ is peculiar to Dhivehi among Indo-Aryan languages. In some dialects, it is pronounced as a [ɽ̊] or [ɽ̊͜r̊]. The /ʂ/ is related historically and allophonically to /ʈ/ (but not to Sanskrit /ʂ/ or /ɕ/). Sometime after the 12th century, the intervocalic /ʈ/ became [ʂ] /raʈu/ 'island' (12th c.), [raʂu] 'island'. The /ʈ/ is retained in geminate clusters like /feʂuni:/ 'started', /faʈʈaifi/ 'has caused to start'. The contrast between /ʂ/ and /ʈ/ was made through loan words like /koʂani:/ 'cutting', /koʈari/ 'room'.

/ʃ/ is a loan phoneme (see section below). Although most speakers clearly distinguish between /ʃ/ and /ʂ/, some researchers report that this contrast is diminishing among younger speakers, especially those receiving education in English..

== Borrowed phonemes ==
Modern Standard Maldivian has borrowed many phonemes from Arabic. These phonemes are used exclusively in loan words from Arabic, for example, the phoneme /x/ in words such as /xaːdim/ ('male servant'). However, most Maldivians do not pronounce the sounds exactly. The following table shows the phonemes that have been borrowed from Arabic (and /ʒ/ from Persian and English) with their transliteration into Tāna, and their original and native pronunciation.

Tāna	Arabic	SAMT	IPA Original / Dhivehi
ޙ	ح	ḥ	[ħ] / [h]
ޚ	خ	x	[x] / [h]
ޜ	ژ	ʒ	[ʒ] / [ʒ]
ޢ	ع	‘	[ʕ] / [ʔ]
ޣ	غ	ġ	[ɣ] / [g] or [ʔ]
ޥ	و	w	[w] / [ʋ]
ޛ	ذ	ź	[ð] / [z̺]
ޠ	ط	ţ	[tˤ] / [t̪]
ޡ	ظ	ẓ	[ðˤ] / [l] or [z̺]
ޘ	ث	ṡ	[θ] / [s̺]
ޤ	ق	q	[q] / [g]
ޞ	ص	ş	[sˤ] / [s̺]
ޟ	ض	ḑ	[dˤ] / [l]
ޝ	ش	ś	[ʃ] / [ʃ] or [s̺]

== Phonotactics ==
Native Maldivian words do not allow initial consonant clusters; the syllable structure is (C)V(C) (i.e. one vowel with the option of a consonant in the onset and/or coda). This affects the introduction of loanwords, such as /ʔis.kuːl/ from English school.

Many distinctions are neutralized in coda. In native words, only /m/, /n/, /k/, /ʂ/, /t̪/, and /s/ may occur in coda. Moreover, prepausally, /m/ and /n/ are realized as [ŋ]; /k/ and /ʂ/ are realized as [ʔ]; and /t̪/ is realized as [i̯ʔ]. Before another consonant, /m/ and /n/ become homorganic nasals, while /k/ and /ʂ/ geminate the following consonant, and /t̪/ is realized as [i̯] and also geminates the following consonant. Word-finally before a vowel-initial word, these codas are all pronounced [ŋ] except /s/. For example, /aʂ/ is pronounced [aʔ]; /aʂvana/ is [avvana]; and /aʂ aharu/ is [aŋ aharu].

== Bibliography ==
- Gnanadesikan, Amalia E. (2017). Dhivehi: The Language of the Maldives. Berlin: De Gruyter Mouton.
- Maumoon, Yumna (2002), A General Overview of the Dhivehi Language (PDF), Malé, Maldives: National Centre for Linguistic and Historical Research, ISBN 99915-1-032-X
