= Delateralization =

Consonant sound change

Delateralization is a replacement of a lateral consonant by a median consonant.

== Yeísmo (Romance languages) ==
Arguably, the best known example of this sound change is yeísmo, which occurs in many Spanish and some Galician dialects.

In accents with yeísmo, the palatal lateral approximant /ʎ/ merges with the palatal approximant /ʝ/ which, phonetically, can be an affricate [ɟ͡ʝ] (word-initially and after /n/), an approximant [ʝ̞] (in other environments) or a fricative [ʝ] (in the same environments as the approximant, but only in careful speech).

In Romanian, the palatal lateral approximant /ʎ/ merged with /j/ centuries ago. The same happened to the historic palatal nasal /ɲ/, although that is an example of lenition.

In French, ⟨il⟩ (except in the word "il" [il]) and ⟨ill⟩ (usually followed by -e; exceptions include ville [vil]) are usually pronounced [ij]. It generally occurs word- or morpheme-finally. For example, travail "work" (noun) [tʁavaj], travaillait "(he/she/it) used to work" [tʁavaje], gentille "kind" feminine singular [ʒɑ̃tij].

Furthermore, when a French word ending in -al is pluralized, rather than becoming -als, it becomes -aux. For example, un animal spécial "a special animal" > des animaux spéciaux "(some) special animals".

== English ==
In some accents, when [l] appears word-finally, or after a vowel and before a consonant, it can become [w]. For example, little [ˈlɪ.tʰl̩] > [ˈlɪ.tʰw̩], bell [bɛl] > [bɛw], help [hɛlp] > [hɛwpʰ].

== Polish ==
The Polish letter Ł represents the sound [w]. The orthography is evidence of an original lateral.

== Arabic Ḍād ==
Another known example of delateralization is the sound change that happened to the Arabic ḍād, which, historically, was a lateral consonant, either a pharyngealized voiced alveolar lateral fricative [ɮˤ] or a similar affricated sound [d͡ɮˤ] or [dˡˤ]. The affricated form is suggested by loans of ḍ into Akkadian as ld or lṭ and into Malaysian as dl. However, some linguists, such as the French orientalist André Roman supposes that the letter was actually a pharyngealized voiced alveolo-palatal sibilant [ʑˤ], similar to the Polish ź, which is not a lateral sound.

In modern Arabic, there are three possible realizations of this sound, all of which are central:

- Pharyngealized voiced alveolar stop [dˤ]
- Pharyngealized voiced dental stop [d̪ˤ]
- Velarized voiced dental stop [d̪ˠ].

== Mochica ==
The Mochica language, around the 18th and 19th centuries, shifted the lateral sounds [l] and [𝼆] to [x] and [ç].

Place →	Labial					Coronal										Dorsal					Laryngeal			
Manner ↓	Bilabial		Labiodental		Linguolabial		Dental		Alveolar		Postalveolar		Retroflex		(Alveolo-)palatal		Velar		Uvular		Pharyngeal/epiglottal		Glottal	
Nasal	m̥	m	ɱ̊	ɱ		n̼	n̪̊	n̪	n̥	n	n̠̊	n̠	ɳ̊	ɳ	ɲ̊	ɲ	ŋ̊	ŋ	ɴ̥	ɴ				
Plosive	p	b	p̪	b̪	t̼	d̼	t̪	d̪	t	d			ʈ	ɖ	c	ɟ	k	ɡ	q	ɢ	ʡ		ʔ	
Sibilant affricate							t̪s̪	d̪z̪	ts	dz	t̠ʃ	d̠ʒ	tʂ	dʐ	tɕ	dʑ								
Non-sibilant affricate	pɸ	bβ	p̪f	b̪v			t̪θ	d̪ð	tɹ̝̊	dɹ̝	t̠ɹ̠̊˔	d̠ɹ̠˔			cç	ɟʝ	kx	ɡɣ	qχ	ɢʁ	ʡʜ	ʡʢ	ʔh	
Sibilant fricative							s̪	z̪	s	z	ʃ	ʒ	ʂ	ʐ	ɕ	ʑ								
Non-sibilant fricative	ɸ	β	f	v	θ̼	ð̼	θ	ð	θ̠	ð̠	ɹ̠̊˔	ɹ̠˔	ɻ̊˔	ɻ˔	ç	ʝ	x	ɣ	χ	ʁ	ħ	ʕ	h	ɦ
Approximant		β̞		ʋ				ð̞		ɹ		ɹ̠		ɻ		j		ɰ						˷
Tap/flap		ⱱ̟		ⱱ					ɾ̥	ɾ			ɽ̊	ɽ						ɢ̆		ʡ̆		
Trill	ʙ̥	ʙ							r̥	r		r̠	ɽ̊r̥	ɽr					ʀ̥	ʀ	ʜ	ʢ		
Lateral affricate									tɬ	dɮ			tꞎ	d𝼅	c𝼆	ɟʎ̝	k𝼄	ɡʟ̝						
Lateral fricative							ɬ̪		ɬ	ɮ			ꞎ	𝼅	𝼆	ʎ̝	𝼄	ʟ̝						
Lateral approximant								l̪	l̥	l		l̠	ɭ̊	ɭ	ʎ̥	ʎ	ʟ̥	ʟ		ʟ̠				
Lateral tap/flap									ɺ̥	ɺ			𝼈̊	𝼈		ʎ̆		ʟ̆						

		BL	LD	D	A	PA	RF	P	V	U
Implosive	Voiced	ɓ			ɗ		ᶑ	ʄ	ɠ	ʛ
Implosive	Voiceless	ɓ̥			ɗ̥		ᶑ̊	ʄ̊	ɠ̊	ʛ̥
Ejective	Stop	pʼ			tʼ		ʈʼ	cʼ	kʼ	qʼ
Ejective	Affricate		p̪fʼ	tθʼ	tsʼ	tʃʼ	tʂʼ	tɕʼ	kxʼ	qχʼ
Ejective	Fricative	ɸʼ	fʼ	θʼ	sʼ	ʃʼ	ʂʼ	ɕʼ	xʼ	χʼ
Ejective	Lateral affricate				tɬʼ			c𝼆ʼ	k𝼄ʼ	q𝼄ʼ
Ejective	Lateral fricative				ɬʼ					
Click (top: velar; bottom: uvular)	Tenuis	kʘ qʘ		kǀ qǀ	kǃ qǃ		k𝼊 q𝼊	kǂ qǂ		
Click (top: velar; bottom: uvular)	Voiced	ɡʘ ɢʘ		ɡǀ ɢǀ	ɡǃ ɢǃ		ɡ𝼊 ɢ𝼊	ɡǂ ɢǂ		
Click (top: velar; bottom: uvular)	Nasal	ŋʘ ɴʘ		ŋǀ ɴǀ	ŋǃ ɴǃ		ŋ𝼊 ɴ𝼊	ŋǂ ɴǂ	ʞ	
Click (top: velar; bottom: uvular)	Tenuis lateral				kǁ qǁ					
Click (top: velar; bottom: uvular)	Voiced lateral				ɡǁ ɢǁ					
Click (top: velar; bottom: uvular)	Nasal lateral				ŋǁ ɴǁ					
