= Palatal lateral fricative =

Palatal lateral fricative may refer to:

- Voiceless palatal lateral fricative
- Voiced palatal lateral fricative
