= Palatal lateral approximant (disambiguation) =

A palatal lateral approximant is a speech sound, but the term is ambiguous and can refer to the following:

- Voiceless palatal lateral approximant [ʎ̥]
- Voiced palatal lateral approximant [ʎ]
