= Velar lateral fricative =

Velar lateral fricative may refer to:

- Voiceless velar lateral fricative
- Voiced velar lateral fricative
