= Faroese phonology =

System of sounds of the Faroese language

The phonology of Faroese has an inventory similar to the closely related Icelandic language, but markedly different processes differentiate the two. Similarities include an aspiration contrast in stop consonants, the retention of front rounded vowels and vowel quality changes instead of vowel length distinctions.

Faroese is not remotely close to having a standard and difference between dialects are very marked. When diving into the specifics, this article primarily discusses Tórshavn varieties, as it is the biggest city on the islands and where most academics have a pied-à-terre.

== Vowels ==
As with other Germanic languages, Faroese has a large number of vowel phonemes; by one analysis, long and short vowels may be considered separate phonemes, with 26 in total. Vowel distribution is similar to other North Germanic languages in that short vowels appear in closed syllables (those ending in consonant clusters or long consonants) and long vowels appearing in open syllables.

There is considerable variation among dialects in the pronunciation of vowels.

Map showing major Faroese isoglosses. Adapted from Þráinsson, Jacobsen & Hansen (2004:368), citing the work of Eivind Weyhe

=== Monophthongs ===
Monophthongs of Faroese, based on formant values in Peterson (2000, Fig. 4).

Faroese monophthongs
	Front				Central		Back	
	unrounded		rounded		Central		Back	
	short	long	short	long	short	long	short	long
Close	ɪ	iː	ʏ	(yː)			ʊ	uː
Mid	ɛ	eː	œ	øː			ɔ	oː
Open					a	(aː)		

- /yː/ and /aː/ appear only in loanwords.
- The long mid vowels /eː, øː, oː/ tend to be diphthongized to [eɛː ~ ɪ̟əː, øœː ~ ʏ̈əː, oɔː ~ ʊ̠əː]. (Note: This is a common trend in Scandinavian languages, as can be seen in the charts of: Eklund & Traunmüller (1997:11), interested in Standard Central Swedish, supporting transcriptions as ⟦iɛ, ø̈œ̈, ʊ̠ö̞⟧; Flego & Berkson (2020:9), describing the vowels of Reykjavík Icelandic, pointing to ⟦eɛ, ɵɞ̝, oɔ̈⟧; Natvig (2018:105, 114), averaging data from all over Norway, ended up with the narrow [e̞ɛ ɵɵ̞ oɔ̝]) Those diphthongs tend to have noticeably closer starting points.
- Peterson (2000) conducted preliminary acoustic studies in fall 1997 on unknown informants, giving insights on the precise acoustic of native vowels (so excluding /yː/ and /aː/):
  - /ɪ, ʏ, ʊ/ are more open than the corresponding tense vowels, with /ɪ/ being the most open of the three ([ɪ̞]) and having a smaller F1 difference with /eː/ as /iː/ with /uː/ (and an even smaller F2 one). The F2 value of /ʏ/ is a flick higher than /œ/'s ([ʏ̠]).
  - /ɔ/ has the same F1 value as /œ/, which in turn serves as middle point between /ɛ/ and /øː/ this suggests true-mid opening [ɔ̝] (it is also, as common for "ɔ-type" vowels, slightly more central than /oː/ but not as much as /ʊ/). Meanwhile, the F2 of /ɛ, œ/ is remarkably close, /œ/ standing on a median line between /iː/ and /uː/; this points to the narrow transcriptions [ɛ̠], [ɵ̞].
  - The F1 value of /a/ is just slightly higher than that of /ɛ/, suggesting that it is a near-open vowel. In addition, its F2 value is right between that of /ɔ/ and /ʊ/, which suggests that it is a near-open near-back vowel [ɑ̽].
  - /iː, uː, eː, øː, oː/ are very close to the value usually denoted by such symbols. Of anecdotal importance is that /uː/ is closer than /iː/ (as much as /œ/ is than /ɛ/). Also /øː/ is somewhat backer than /œ/, comparable to the difference between /eː/ and /ɛ/ ([ɵ̠ː]).

=== Diphthongs ===
Fronting diphthongs of Faroese, based on formant values in Peterson (2000, Fig. 6).

Backing diphthongs of Faroese, based on formant values in Peterson (2000, Fig. 7–8).

Faroese Diphthongs
	/-i/	/-a/	/-u/
/ʏ- ~ ʊ-/	ʊi(ː)		ʉuː
/ɛ-/	ɛiː	ɛaː	ɛuː
/œ-/			œuː
/ɔ-/	ɔi(ː)	ɔaː	ɔuː
/a-/	ai(ː)		auː

- Árnason observes that the rounding of the first element in /ʉu/ is variable. This is reminiscent of the GOOSE fronting in some dialects of English (although English took it step further and can have it totally unrounded).
- In the north (cf. isogloss map) native /ai/ has merged with /ɔi/. (Note: But not in borrowings as in kai [ˈkʰäiː] 'quay')
- /ɔa/ can be pronounced a variety of ways. In addition to the diphthong nominally transcribed as [ɔɑː], it can be an unrounded monophthong of variable backness (up to true front), a trait said to belong to the northern and eastern islands. (Note: Its short alternant remains /ɔ/ under all circumstances.)
- In the North and the West (cf. isogloss map) the first element of /ɔu/ is central, its roundedness being another variable, some varieties even making it identifiable as /ɛu/. This creates a possible merger between nón [ˈnɔuːn ~ ˈnəuːn ~ ˈnœuːn ~ ˈnɛuːn] '3 o'clock (≡ noon)', nøvn [ˈnœuːn] 'names'. It is also possible for dialects which have a back /ɔu/ to make it alternate with /œ/ instead of /ɔ/ (as is the case in Tórshavn).
- Short [au] is a debatable entity (as otherwise only i-diphthongs would appear in short/long pairs). A lot of native speakers pronounce words like javnt 'even adj.n' as [ˈjauːnt] and /avnC/ does not occur in roots, which would prevent any such analogies. Other instances like klaustrofobi and sound are unhelpful; the former often falls under secondary stress, where vowel duration is less prominent and the latter can be considered an unadapted borrowing. In the dictionaries published by Sprotin, are documented 1) a /v/ less pronunciation [ˈjan̥t] 2) in the case of javnt, an assimilated pronunciation [ˈjam̥t]. Sequence pronunciations like [av] also occur.
  - Even less common are [ɛu], [œu], (Note: /ɔv/ doesn't occur in short environments, the long version can be found in ovnur 'stove, radiator'.)
- Peterson (2000) divides diphthongs into falling, further subdivided into i- and u-diphthongs and hovering diphthongs for which it is impossible to determine which part is the most prominent. He also gives insight into the acoustic of them (long):
  - /ʉu/ starts heavily front (on par with /ɪ/) (ʏu) whilst /ʊi/ starts as central as /œ/ and as close as /i/ to end up as front as /ɪ/ and negligeably more open than /ʏ/ (ʉɪ)
  - /ɛi/ starts where all other i-diphthongs end to itself end at cardinal [i] (ɪi). /ɛa/'s onset is on par with /œ/ and fronter than /ɛ/ (i.e. true central) to end at the openest mouth position of the inventory being in the meantime as back as /ʊ/ (ɛ̝ɑ̟). /ɔu/, written ⟨ɛu⟩ on the charts, shares its F2 value with /ɛ/ but is more open by a large margin (i.e. close-mid) (ɘ̟u)
  - /ɔi/ is a bit closer than /øː/, as it is closer to the F1 of /ʊ/ and almost as central as the former is (ʊ̟ɪ), /ɔa/ ditto for the first element, halts its opening at the level of /a/ but backer, on par with /oː/ (ʊ̟ɒ̠).
  - /ai/ is a schwa plus an offglide (əɪ). [au] was not included in the study but stems from an a sequence plus offglide, labialised velar or weak (non-velarised) fricative.

Faroese vowel alternations
Monophthongs
		Long vowel			Short vowel		
/i/	i	linur	[ˈliːnʊɹ]	'soft'	lint	[ˈlɪn̥t]	'soft (N.)'
/e/	e	frekur	[ˈfɹeː(ʰ)kʊɹ ~ ˈfɹeεːkʊɹ]	'greedy'	frekt	[ˈfɹɛʰkt]	'greedy (N.)'
/y/	y	mytisk	[ˈmyːtɪsk]	'mythological'	mystisk	[ˈmʏstɪsk]	'mysterious'
/ø/	ø	høgur	[ˈhøːʋʊɹ ~ ˈhøœːʋʊɹ]	'high (M.)'	høgt	[hœkt]	'high (N.)'
/u/	u	gulur	[ˈkuːlʊɹ]	'yellow'	gult	[kʊl̥t]	'yellow (N.)'
/o/	o	tola	[ˈtʰoːla ~ ˈtʰoɔːla]	'to endure'	toldi	[ˈtʰɔltɪ]	'endured'
/a/	a	Kanada	[ˈkʰaːnata]	'Canada'	land	[ˈlant]	'land'
Diphthongs
		Long vowel			Short vowel		
/ʊi/ (Note: Phonetically short diphthongs can have in some specific words a monophthong instead of their regular alternant, e.g. in Northern Streymoy týskt 'German ADJ' is pronounced [ˈtʰʊkst].)	í	hvítur	[ˈkfʊiːtʊɹ]	'white (M.)'	hvítt	[ˈkfʊiʰtː]	'white (N.)'
/ɛi/	ey	deyður	[ˈteiːjʊɹ]	'dead (M.)'	deytt	[ˈtɛʰtː]	'dead (N.)'
/ai/	ei	feitur	[ˈfaiːtʊɹ]	'fat (M.)'	feitt	[ˈfaiʰtː ~ ˈfɔiʰtː]	'fat (N.)'
/ɔi/	oy	gloyma	[ˈklɔiːma]	'to forget'	gloymdi	[ˈklɔimtɪ]	'forgot'
/ɛa/	a	spakur	[ˈspɛaː(ʰ)kʊɹ]	'calm (M.)'	spakt	[ˈspakt]	'calm (N.)'
/ɔa/	á	vátur	[ˈvɔaː(ʰ)tʊɹ]	'wet (M.)'	vátt	[ˈvɔʰtː]	'wet (N.)'
/ʉu/	ú	fúlur	[ˈfʉuːlʊɹ]	'foul (M.)'	fúlt	[ˈfʏl̥t]	'foul (N.)'
/ɔu/	ó	tómur	[ˈtʰɔuːmʊɹ ~ ˈtʰɛuːmʊɹ]	'empty (M.)'	tómt	[ˈtʰœm̥t ~ ˈtʰɔm̥t]	'empty (N.)'

Faroese marginal diphthongs
		Long vowel			Short vowel		
/ɛv/	ev	fevna	[ˈfɛvna ~ ˈfɛuːna]	'to embrace, to fathom SUP'	fevnt	[ˈfɛvn̥t ~ ˈfɛun̥t ~ ˈfɛuːnt ~ ˈfɛn̥t]	'INF'
/œv/	øv	svøvnast	[svœvnast ~ svœuːnast]	'to get sleepy'	svøvnd	[svœvnt ~ svœu(ː)nt ~ svœnt]	'sleepiness'
/ɔv/	ov	ovna	[ˈɔvna ~ ˈɔuːna]	'stove, radiator'			
/av/	av	javnur	[ˈjavnʊɹ ~ jauːnʊɹ]	'even (M.)'	javnt	[ˈjavn̥t ~ ˈjaun̥t ~ ˈjauːnt ~ ˈjam̥t ~ ˈjan̥t]	'even (N.)'

=== Length ===
Vowel length in Faroese is determined by the syllable structure of the simplex word (Note: Though some compound have been lexicalised bátur [ˈpɔaː(ʰ)tʊɹ] 'boat' VS bátsmaður [ˈpɔʰtsmɛavʊɹ] 'shipmate'.) (Note: This can be still seen in Icelandic where vowel length is mostly based on the syllable's current structure e.g.: - Ég kom heim [ˈhɛiːm] 'I came home' - Ég fer heim á morgunn [ˈhɛiːmɑuˌmɔrˑkʏn] 'I'm going home tomorrow' - Ég kom heim til hans [ˈhɛimˑtɪlans] 'I came to his place'.) such that the stressed vowel in:

- Long vowels are so because they take the entire lengthening potential of a stress on them (highly variable duration).
  - tú, gleða are long because they aren't any following closing consonant.
  - túa, bátur, akrar, vekja, bát, báts are long because the following consonant is syllabified as onset to the next syllable (or isn't allowed to form a coda because a lack of following onset).
- Short vowels are so because a following consonant takes a moraic slot; such syllables tend to be slightly longer.
  - størstur, vatn, vatnið are short because a coda is allowed by a following onset.
  - arr, størri are short because the following consonant is long.
  - gjógv, gjógvin, fedrar, eydnast are short because they stem from older fricatives and they tend to be analysed cross-linguistically as codas.
  - øll, allir, oynni are short because they were historically followed by geminates.

=== Hiatus phenomena ===
==== Mending ====
During its history Faroese has deployed an array of processes to mend for hiatus. Inherited hiatus were handled by the process of skerping (and as such have a short stressed vowels). Meanwhile, those created by the loss of medial voiced fricatives and morphological analogy (thus with long vowels) received the following treatment:

- 1) High vowels (long /iː, uː/ and i- & u-diphthongs) are followed by a glide, whether it is inserted or already present is a debatable matter.
  - E.g. siga [siːja] 'to say', deyður [teiːjʊɹ] 'dead adj'; fluga [ˈfluːwa] 'a fly', búði [ˈpuːwɪ] 'lived sg', túa [ˈtʰuːwa] 'to say tú'.
- 2) When followed by (near-)close /ɪ, ʊ/, they have an epenthetic lenis continuant (respectively: [j, v]) separating them.
  - E.g. legu [ˈleːvʊ] 'to a lying dat/(the state of) lying down'; laðin [ˈlɛaːjɪn] '(of boats) full'
- 3) When followed by (near-)open /a/, no instertion takes place and the hiatus stays.
  - E.g. lega (Southern) [ˈleːa] 'a lying'; laða [ˈle̞ːa] 'to load'; fáar [ˈfo̞ːaɹ] 'to obtain'

Being still present in the consonant system, /v/ is able to break the regularities described above. Firstly, it has a privileged position in not having taken part in the deletion before /a/. (Note: Though not in some cases, compare grava [ˈkɹɛaːva] 'to dig' with prógva [ˈpʂɛkva] > prófa 'to prove'.) Secondly, -a being a common nominative ending and -u a common accusative desinence, there is a lot of room for analogies to take place and borrowing the glide from one form to another. (Note: As in lega [ˈleːva] 'a lying nom' and legu [ˈleːvʊ] 'obl'.) /v/ doesn't hold the monopoly on analogies e.g. veðrið [ˈvɛkɹɪ] 'weather def' from veður 'idef' [ˈvɛaːvʊɹ] like fagrir [ˈfɛkɹɪɹ] 'beautiful fem.pl' is from fagur [ˈfɛaːvʊɹ].

Árnason considers the hiatus to be non-phonemic in forms like 1) and 3) but the numerous analogies prevent saying the same about situations in 2).

==== Smoothing ====
A-diphthongs are smoothed when followed by /a/. Smoothed diphthongs lose their glide and can have various affectation on their onsets, but the result invariably stays disyllabic. (Note: This is reminiscent of the smoothing in RP of sequences diphthong plus schwa: e.g. 'layer' [ˈle̞ɪə ~ le̞ːə], 'lower' [ˈləʊə ~ ləː], 'loir' [ˈlɔɪə ~ lɔːə]. The smoothing of /ɔɪə/ and /ɔː + ə/ (as in drawer) have different outcomes, the latter vowel being closer However the parallel ends there, in Faroese it is a dissimilation process and applies to hovering diphthongs; in English it is a consequence of the weakness of the glides and is an opption available to any falling diphthong. It crucially outputs a single syllable (other e.g. 'lyre' [~ laːə], 'lour' [~ lɑːə], 'real' [~ ˈɹɪːəɫ], 'gruel' [~ ˈgɹʊːəɫ], and in SSBE 'security' [sɪˈkj̊ʉ̞ːɹɪt(ʰ)ɪi].) The textbook affectation is a mid onset, in slight contrast with close-mid forms (lega (Southern) [ˈleːa] 'a lying' VS laða [ˈle̞ːa] 'to load') but the onset can even be [ɪːj ~ ʊːw] or [iː ~ uː].

=== Unstressed vowels ===
The only unstressed vowels in Faroese are short [ɪ, a, ʊ]; these appear in inflectional endings and reduced syllables áðrenn (e.g. [ˈɔaːɹɪn(ː)] 'before'). Very typical are endings like -ur, -ir, -ar. The dative is often indicated by [ʊn]. (Note: Etymologically spelt ⟨um⟩)

- [a] – bátar [ˈpɔaːtaɹ] 'boats', kallar [ˈkʰatlaɹ] '[you] call'
- [ɪ] – gestir [ˈtʃɛstɪɹ] 'guests', dugir [ˈtuːwɪɹ] '[you] can'
- [ʊ] – bátur [ˈpɔaː(ʰ)tʊɹ] 'boat', gentur [tʃɛn̥tʊɹ] 'girls', rennur [ˈɹɛnːʊɹ] '[you] run'.

In some dialects, unstressed short /ʊ/ is realized as [ø] or is reduced further to [ə]. /ɪ/ goes under a similar reduction pattern as it varies between [ɪ ~ ɛ ~ ə] (Note: As can be heard in this pronunciation piece: Eiði /ˈaiɪ/) so unstressed /ʊ/ and /ɪ/ can rhyme. This can cause spelling mistakes related to these two vowels. The following table displays the different realizations in different dialects.

Unstressed /i/ and /u/ in dialects
Word	Borðoy Kunoy Tórshavn	Viðoy Svínoy Fugloy	Suðuroy	Elsewhere (etymological)
gulur 'yellow'	[ˈkuːləɹ]	[ˈkuːləɹ]	[ˈkuːløɹ]	[ˈkuːlʊɹ]
gulir 'yellow PL'	[ˈkuːləɹ]	[ˈkuːləɹ]	[ˈkuːløɹ]	[ˈkuːlɪɹ]
bygdin 'town'	[ˈpɪktɪn]	[ˈpɪktən]	[ˈpɪktøn]	[ˈpɪktɪn]
bygdum 'towns DAT.PL'	[ˈpɪktʊn]	[ˈpɪktən]	[ˈpɪktøn]	[ˈpɪktʊn]

== Consonants ==
		Labial	Coronal			Dorsal	Glottal
		Labial	Dental / Alveolar	Retro- flex	Palatal	Velar	Glottal
Plosive / Affricate	Fortis	pʰ	tʰ	(ʈʰ)	tʃʰ	kʰ	(ʔ)
Plosive / Affricate	Lenis	p	t	(ʈ)	tʃ	k	(ʔ)
Continuant	Fortis	f	s	(ʂ)	ʃ		h
Continuant	Lenis	v		ɹ (ɻ̊)	j	(w)	h
Sonorant
Sonorant	Nasal	m (m̥)	n (n̥)	(ɳ)	ɲ (ɲ̊)	ŋ (ŋ̊)	
Sonorant	Lateral		l (ɬ)	(ɭ)	(ʎ ʎ̥)		

- /f, v/ are labiodental, albeit "not as clearly labiodental as in English" according to Kristján Árnason. Intervocalic /v/ is usually an approximant [ʋ], whereas word-initial /v/ varies between an approximant [ʋ] and a fricative [v].
- /ɹ/ ranges from (post-)alveolar to retroflex, and from a trill (only in elderly speech) to an approximant, fricatives being the predominant allophones. Taps regularly occur in stressed syllables onsets, especially after un(post)aspirated /p, t, k/.
- /n/ is dental [n̪], whereas /tʰ, t/ vary between being dental [t̪ʰ, t̪] and (less commonly) alveolar [tʰ, t].
- Initial /l/ is dental [l̪] or alveolar [l]. Postvocalic /l/ may be more of a postalveolar lateral [l̠], especially after back vowels.
- /l/ assimilates to nearby palatals, resulting in the variants [ʎ̥, ʎ] ([ʎ̥] occurring when [ʎ] is devoiced): kjálki [ˈtʃʰaʎ̥tʃɪ] 'jaw', telgja [ˈtʰεʎtʃa] 'to carve'. Pronunciation of initial /lj/ varies situationally between the sequence [lj] and a palatal lateral ([ʎ]) or, possibly the most common realisation, a palatal approximant ([j]).
- /tʃʰ, tʃ/ are palato-alveolar, and vary between stops [t̠ʲʰ, t̠ʲ] and affricates [tʃʰ, tʃ].
- [w] is the vocalised allophone of /v/ in coda position. Such sequences are treated as diphthongs, as they can be either long or (although marginally and in spurious cases) short. Also, /av/ is the only native source of [au(ː)], e.g. havn [hauːn] 'haven', javnt [jaun̥t] ~ [jauːnt] 'even N'. Vocalisation is not the only option as hav [hɛaːʋ] 'sea' and havs [hafs] ~ (Suðuroy) [haʋs] 'sea GEN' show it.
- [x, ɣ] are highly marginal allophones of /kʰ, k/ only reported to have occurred before another plosive.
- /h/ is treated by Árnason as voiced.
- [ʔ] frequently occurs in stressed syllable with an "empty" onsets. In this position, its most notable feature is its blocking of vowel elision: Okkurt um árið 190'8 [ˈʔɔʰkʊɻ̊ʈumˈʔɔɑːɹəˈnʊiːʧɔntɾʊˈʔɔʰta] '[Something] around the year 1908'.

There are several phonological processes involved in Faroese, including:

- Liquid consonants are devoiced before voiceless consonants
- Nasal consonants generally assume the place of articulation and laryngeal settings of following consonants, especially /n/.
  - This includes /s/, hansara [ˈhan̥saɹa] 'his'
- Velar stop consonants (/kʰ/, /k/) palatalize to [t͡ʃʰ, t͡ʃ] before /iː, ɪ, eː, ɛ, ɛi, j/.
  - Alveolar stops (/tʰ/, /t/) also palatalize to [t͡ʃʰ, t͡ʃ] before /j/.
- /v/ becomes devoiced to /f/ adjacent to voiceless consonants, ⟨kv⟩ /kʰv/, [kf]
- ⟨l, s⟩ represent the palatal [ʎ, ʃ] after /ɛi, ai, ɔi, ʊi/ and another consonant within the same simplex word. As in hvíld [ˈkʰvʊiʎt] 'break, respite', pískari [ˈpʰʊiʃkaɹɪ] 'whisk'
- /sk/ becomes /ʃ/ before /iː, ɪ, eː, ɛ, ɛi, j/ (but in morphological forms often /stʃ/ word internally, i.e. elski [ɛɬstʃɪ] 'I love')
  - ⟨stj⟩ exhibits more variability stjórn 'board, governing body' is only attested as [stjœtn], stjørna 'star' as both [ʃ- ~ stjœtna], and stjóra 'to haul ashore/aboard' only with the palatal initial [ˈʃɔuːɹa].
  - ⟨tsj⟩ on the other hand uniformly represents [ʰt + ʃ] or [ʰtʃː] in adaptations of foreign loans útsjón [ˈʉuːtˌʃɔun] 'view, appearance', ketsjupp [ˈkʰɛʰtʃːˌʊʰpː], bratsj [ˈpɾaʰtʃː].
- /ɹ/ retroflexes itself as well as following consonants in consonant clusters, yielding the allophones [ʂ, ɭ, ʈ, ɳ] while /ɹ/ itself becomes [ɻ], example: ⟨rd⟩ [ɻʈ]; preaspirated consonants devoice the rhotic: example: ⟨rt⟩ [ɻ̊ʈ]; ⟨rs⟩ is usually [ʂː] (only in some loanwords [ɻ̊ʂ]), e.g. Tórshavn [ˈtʰɔuʂˌhaun]. Voiceless [ɻ̊] is usually realised as [ʂ].
- Pre-stopping of original ⟨ll⟩ to [tl] and ⟨nn⟩ to [tn], after diphthongs for the latter.
  - [tl] -just like [kl]- is not necessarily voiceless, even less so word-finally.
- ⟨rn⟩ often represents [tn], compare børn [ˈpœtn] 'children' with ørn [ˈœɻɳ] 'eagle'
- Intervocalically the aspirated consonants become pre-aspirated unless followed by a closed vowel. In clusters, the aspiration merges with sonorants, rendering them voiceless: e.g. ⟨nt⟩ [n̥t]

=== Omissions in consonant clusters ===
Faroese tends to omit the first or second consonant in clusters of different consonants:

- fjals [fjals] 'mountain's' instead of *[fjatls] from [fjatl] (NOM). Other examples for genitives are: barns [ˈpans] 'child's', vatns [van̥s] 'water's'.
- hjálpti [jɔɬtɪ] 'helped' PAST SG' instead of *[ˈjɔɬptɪ] from hjálpa [ˈjɔɬpa]. Other examples for past forms are: sigldi [ˈsɪltɪ] 'sailed', yrkti [ˈɪɻ̊ʈɪ] 'wrote poetry'.
- due to metathesis then simplification are homophone: fylgdi 'followed' and fygldi 'caught birds with a net': [ˈfɪltɪ].
- skt will be:
  1. [st] in words of more than one syllable: føroyskt [ˈføːɹɪst] 'Faroese N.SG'; russiskt [ˈɹʊsːɪst] 'Russian N.SG'; íslendskt [ˈʊʃlɛŋ̊st] 'Icelandic N.SG'.
  2. [kst] in monosyllables: enskt [ɛŋ̊kst] 'English N.SG'; danskt [taŋ̊kst] 'Danish N.SG'; franskt [fɹaŋ̊kst] 'French N.SG'; spanskt [spaŋ̊kst] 'Spanish N.SG'; svenskt [svɛŋ̊kst] 'Swedish N.SG'; týskt [tʰʊikst] 'German N.SG'.
    - However [ʂt] in: írskt [ʊʂt] 'Irish N.SG', norskt [nɔʂt] 'Norwegian N.SG'

== Phonological history ==
=== Vowel mergers ===
The earliest vowel shifts involved mid and low vowels. Pairs of Old West Scandinavian (OWS) front vowels (mid and open) merged into a single series, with long–short counterparts: /e/ and /ɛ/ became /e/, while /eː/ and /ɛː/ became /æː/. Additionally, /aː/ was subsequently rounded and merged into /ɔː/, but short /ɔ/ was fronted and merged with /œ/ (bǫrn → børn 'children'). There were special developments when adjacent to nasal consonants: /ɔ/ remained as a back vowel (lǫnd → lond 'countries'), but /ɔː/ merged with /oː/ (spónn → spónur 'spoon').

Short			Long		
/e/	→	/ɛ/	/eː/	→	/æː/
/ɛ/	→	/ɛ/	/ɛː/	→	/æː/
/ø/	→	/ø/	/øː/	→	/øː/
/ɔ/	→	/ø/	/ɔː/	→	/ɔː/
/a/	→	/a/	/aː/	→	/ɔː/

Similar to the Great Vowel Shift in English, Faroese has undergone breaking of long vowels. Initially, high vowels /iː/, /yː/, and /uː/ were broken into /ɪi/, /ʏy/, and /ʊu/, respectively. Then, front high vowels (both long and short), /ɪi/—/ʏy/ and /i/—/y/ merged as /ʊi/ and /i/ in all dialects (Christer Lindqvist in 2003 suggested an intermediary form for the diphthong: [ʉy] → [ʊy]). Meanwhile, back vowel /oː/ broke as /ɔu/ (but /əu/ in the north).

=== Skerping ===
Skerping
Written	Pronunciation	instead of
-ógv-	[ɛkv]	*[ɔu̯kv] (expected fronting: *[œy̯kv])
-úgv-	[ɪkv]	*[ʉu̯kv] (expected fronting: *[yy̯kv] → *[yːkv])
-eyggj-	[ɛtʃː]	*[ɛi̯tʃː]
-íggj-, -ýggj-	[ʊtʃː]	*[ʊitʃː]
-eiggj-	[atʃː]	*[aitʃː]
-oyggj-	[ɔtʃː]	*[ɔitʃː]

The so-called "skerping" ([ʃɛʂpɪŋk] 'sharpening') is a typical phenomenon of fronting back vowels before [kv] and monophthongizing certain diphthongs before long [tʃː]. Skerping is not indicated orthographically.

- [ɛkv]: Jógvan [ˈjɛkvan] 'a form of the name John', gjógv [tʃɛkv] 'cleft'
- [ɪkv]: kúgv [kʰɪkv] 'cow', trúgva [ˈtʂɪkva] 'believe', but: trúleysur [ˈtʂʉuːˌlɛisʊɹ] 'faithless'
- [ɛtʃː]: heyggjur [ˈhɛtʃːʊɹ] 'high M', but heygnum [ˈhɛiːnʊn] 'high D.SG'
- [ʊtʃː]: nýggjur [ˈnʊtʃːʊɹ] 'new M', but nýtt [nʊiʰtː] 'New N'
- [atʃː]: beiggi [ˈpatʃːɪ] 'brother'
- [ɔtʃː]: oyggj [ɔtʃː] 'island', but oynna [ˈɔitna] 'island Acc.SG'

== Sample ==
=== Universal Declaration of Human Rights ===
The following is a sample text of Article 1 of the Universal Declaration of Human Rights. The first line is the orthographic version; the second is the International Phonetic Alphabet transcription. A recording is available on the UDHR audio project's website.

{Grein 1:} Øll menniskju eru fødd fræls og jøvn til virðingar og mannarættindi. Tey hava skil og samvitsku og eiga {at fara} hvørt um annað í bróðuranda.
{ˈfɪsːta ˈkɹaiːn ||} ˈʔœtˑl ˈmɛnːɪʃʊ (Note: Sandhi phenomena (nasal assimilation, h- and final vowel deletion) are sensitive to phrase boundaries.) (ʔ)ɛɹʊ ˌfœtˑ {ˈfɹalːs (Note: The /l/ is velarised in the recording.) (|)} ʔɔ {ˈjœuːn |} tʰɪl {ˈviːɹ.ɪŋkaɹ (|)} ʔɔ {ˈman(ː)a.ˌɹaʰtːɪntɪ ||} tʰɛi ‿(h)ava {ˈʃiːl (|)} ʔɔ {ˌsaɱː‿.vɪskˈʊˑ |} ʔɔ ˈʔaiː(a)‿ {a(t) faɹa (|)} ˈkfœɻ̊ːʈ ʊm ˌanːa (ʔ)ʊi ˈpɹɔuːvʊɹ.ˌanːta
1^{st} article: All humans are born free and equal in terms of respect and rights. They [all] have conscience and reason and ought to behave each around another in brotherhood.

=== Lord's Prayer ===
The following is a sample text of the Lord's Prayer in Faroese. The first line is the orthographic version; the second is the International Phonetic Alphabet transcription. A recording posted under the @teknmal767 channel is available on YouTube, it contains two performances of the prayer spoken and signed.

Faðir vár, Tú, sum ert í Himli. Heilagt verði navn Títt. Komi ríki Títt. Verði vilji Tín, sum í Himli, so á jørð. Gev okkum {í dag} okkara dagliga breyð. Og fyrigev okkum syndir okkara, {so sum} vit eisini fyrigeva teimum, ið móti okkum synda. [Og] Leið okkum ikki í fre[i]stingar, men frels okkum frá {tí illa}. Tí at [T]ítt er ríkið, valdið og heiðurin um allar ævir. Amen.
ˈfɛaːjɪɹ {ˈvɔaːɹ |} ˈtʰʉuː sʊm ˌ(ʔ)ɛɻ̊ːʈ ʊi {ˈhɪmːlɪ ||} {ˈhaiːlaʰt (|)} (ˈ)ve(ː)ɹɪ ˌnauːn {ˈtʰʊiʰtː |} ˈkʰoːmɪ ˌɹʊiːt͡ʃɪ {ˈtʰʊiʰtː ||} ˈveːɹɪ ˌvɪlːjɪ {ˈtʰʊiːn |} sʊm ʊi {ˈhɪmːlɪ (|)} so ʔɔa {ˈjøːɹ ||} ˈt͡ʃeːv ɔʰkˑʊn ʊiˈtɛaː ɔʰkˑaɹa ˌtak.lija {ˈpɹɛiː ||} ʔɔ ˈfiˑɹɪ.ˌt͡ʃeːv ɔʰkˑʊn ˈsɪnːtɪɹ {ɔʰkˑaɹa ||} {soˑ sʊɱ‿} ˈviˑt ˈʔaiːsɪnɪ ˈfiˑɹɪ.ˌt͡ʃɛva {ˈtʰaiːmʊn |} ʔʊi ˈmɛuːtɪ ɔʰkˑʊn {ˈsɪnːta ||} ʔɔ ˈlaiː ɔʰkˑʊn ɪʰt͡ʃˑ‿ ʊi {ˈfɹaiʃːt.ɪŋkaɹ |} mɛn ˈfɹɛɬːs ɔʰkˑʊn ˌfɹɔaː {tʰʊiˈʔɪtˑla ||} tʰʊi at ˈtʰʊiʰtː ɛɹ {‿ˈʊiːt͡ʃɪ |} {ˈvalːtɪ (|)} ʔɔ {ˈhaiː(ʊ)ɹɪn |} ʔʊm ˈʔatˑlaɹ {ˈʔɛaːvɪɹ ||} ˈʔamːˌɛn
Our Father, You, who is in Heaven. Holy be Your name, come Your kingdom, done be Your will, on earth as [is] in Heaven. Give us today our daily bread. And forgive us our sins, just as we also forgive those who sinned against us. And do not lead us into temptation(s), but deliver us from evil [lit: it badly]. For to You is the realm, the power and the glory through all [of] eternity [lit: lifetimes]. Amen.

== Bibliography ==
Faroese language sources

- Árnason, Kristján (2011). The Phonology of Icelandic and Faroese. Oxford University Press. ISBN 978-0199229314.
- Barnes, Michael P.; Weyhe, Eivind (1994). "7: Faroese". In van der Auwera, Johan; König, Ekkehard (eds.). The Germanic Languages. Routledge Language Family. pp. 190–218. ISBN 978-0-415-05768-4.
- Barnes, Michael P. (2005). "The standard languages and their systems in the 20th century: Faroese". In Oskar Bandle; Kurt Braunmiller; Ernst Hakon Jahr; Allan Karker; Hans-Peter Naumann; Ulf Teleman; L. Elmevik; G. Widmark (eds.). The Nordic Languages. HSK (22). Vol. 2. Walter de Gruyter. pp. 1574–1583. ISBN 3-11-017149-X.
- Þráinsson, Høskuldur; Jacobsen, Jógvan í Lon; Hansen, Zakaris Svabo (2004). Faroese: An Overview and Reference Grammar. Tórshavn/Reykjavík: Føroya Fróðskaparfelag. ISBN 978-9991841854.
- Peterson, Hjalmar Páll (2000). "Mátingar av sjálvljóðum í føroyskum" [Measurement of Faroese vowels] (PDF). Málting: Tíðarrit um føroyskt mál og málvísindi (in Faroese). 10 (1): 37–43. Archived (PDF) from the original on 2023-12-30.

Dictionary

- Poulsen, J. H. W.; Simonsen, M.; Jacobsen, J. í L.; Johansen, A.; Hansen, Z. Sv., eds. (10 April 2020). "Netaorðabøkur" [Web dictionaries]. Sprotin.

Other languages sources

- Eklund, Ing.; Traunmüller, H. (1997). "Comparative study of male and female whispered and phonated versions of the long vowels of Swedish". Phonetica. 54 (1): 1–21. doi:10.1159/000262207.
- Flego, Stefon; Berkson, Kelly (2020). "A Phonetic Illustration of the Sound System of Icelandic". IULC Working Papers. 20 (1).
- Gimson, Alfred C.; Cruttenden, Alan (2008) [1962]. Gimson's Pronunciation of English (7th ed.). Hodder Education. ISBN 978-0-340-95877-3.
- Lindsey, Geoff (January 22, 2012). "Smoothing, then and now". englishspeechservices.com (blog). Archived from the original on 2 Oct 2025.
- Natvig, David A. (2018). Contrast, variation and change in Norwegian vowel systems (PDF) (Ph. D. thesis). UW.
- Peterson, Hjalmar P.; Voeltzel, Laurence (2025). Lahiri, Aditi (ed.). Faroese Phonetics and Phonology. Phonology and Phonetics. Vol. 34. De Gruyter Mouton. p. 376. ISBN 978-3110750553.
