= Lateral consonant =

Type of consonant

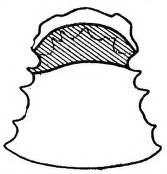
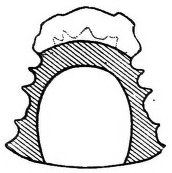
Palatograms of lateral [l] and median [t]

A lateral is a consonant in which the airstream proceeds along one or both of the sides of the tongue, but is blocked by the tongue from going through the middle of the mouth. An example of a lateral consonant is the English L, as in Larry. Lateral consonants contrast with median consonants, in which the airstream flows through the center of the mouth.

For the most common laterals, the tip of the tongue makes contact with the upper teeth (see dental consonant) or the upper gum (see alveolar consonant), but there are many other possible places for laterals to be made. The most common laterals are approximants and belong to the class of liquids, but lateral fricatives and affricates are also common in some parts of the world. Some languages, such as the Iwaidja and Ilgar languages of Australia, have lateral flaps, and others, such as the Xhosa and Zulu languages of Africa, have lateral clicks.

When pronouncing the labiodental fricatives [f] and [v], the lip blocks the airflow in the center of the vocal tract, so the airstream proceeds along the sides instead. Nevertheless, they are not considered lateral consonants because the airflow never goes over the side of the tongue. No known language makes a distinction between lateral and non-lateral labiodentals. Plosives are never lateral, but they may have lateral release. Nasals are almost never lateral either, but reported in Nzema, and some languages have lateral nasal clicks. For consonants articulated in the throat (laryngeals), the lateral distinction is not made by any language, although pharyngeal and epiglottal laterals are reportedly possible.

== Examples ==
English has one lateral phoneme: the lateral approximant /l/, which in many accents has two allophones. One, found before vowels (and /j/) as in lady or fly (or value), is called clear l, pronounced as the alveolar lateral approximant [l] with a "neutral" position of the body of the tongue. The other variant, so-called dark l, found before consonants or word-finally, as in bold or tell, is pronounced as the velarized alveolar lateral approximant [ɫ] with the tongue assuming a spoon-like shape with its back part raised, which gives the sound a [w]- or [ʟ]-like resonance. In some languages, like Albanian, those two sounds are different phonemes. Malsia e Madhe Gheg Albanian and Salamina Arvanitika even have the three-way distinction of laterals /l/, /ʎ/ and /ɫ/. East Slavic languages contrast [ɫ] and [lʲ] but do not have [l].

In many British accents (e.g. Cockney), dark [ɫ] may undergo vocalization through the reduction and loss of contact between the tip of the tongue and the alveolar ridge, becoming a rounded back vowel or glide. This process turns tell into [tɛɰ], as must have happened with talk [tɔːk] or walk [wɔːk] at some stage. A similar process happened during the development of many other languages, including Brazilian Portuguese, Old French, and Polish, in all three of these resulting in voiced velar approximant [ɰ] or voiced labio-velar approximant [w], whence Modern French sauce as compared with Spanish salsa, or Polish Wisła (pronounced [viswa]) as compared with English Vistula.

In central dialects of Venetian, intervocalic /l/ has turned into a semivocalic [e̯], so that the written word ła bała is pronounced [abae̯a]. The orthography uses the letter ł to represent this phoneme (it specifically represents not the [e̯] sound but the phoneme that is, in some dialects, [e̯] and, in others, [l]).

Many Aboriginal Australian languages have a series of three or four lateral approximants, as do various dialects of Irish. Rarer lateral consonants include the retroflex laterals that can be found in many languages of India and in some Swedish dialects, and the voiceless alveolar lateral fricative /ɬ/, found in many Native North American languages, Welsh and Zulu. In Adyghe and some Athabaskan languages like Hän, both voiceless and voiced alveolar lateral fricatives occur, but there is no approximant. Many of these languages also have lateral affricates. Some languages have palatal or velar voiceless lateral fricatives or affricates, such as Dahalo and Zulu, but the IPA has no symbols for such sounds. However, appropriate symbols are easy to make by adding a lateral-fricative belt to the symbol for the corresponding lateral approximant (see below). Also, a devoicing diacritic may be added to the approximant.

Lateral fricative letters

Nearly all languages with such lateral obstruents also have the approximant. However, there are a number of exceptions, many of them located in the Pacific Northwest area of the United States. For example, Tlingit has /tɬ, tɬʰ, tɬʼ, ɬ, ɬʼ/ but no /l/. (Note: Some older Tlingit speakers have [l] as an allophone of /n/. In the Interior dialect, /l/ is partially phonemic.) Other examples from the same area include Nuu-chah-nulth and Kutenai, and elsewhere, Mongolian, Chukchi, and Kabardian.

Standard Tibetan has a voiceless lateral approximant, usually romanized as lh, as in the name Lhasa.

A uvular lateral approximant has been reported to occur in some speakers of American English.

Pashto has a retroflex lateral flap that becomes voiced retroflex approximant when it is at the end of a syllable and a word.

There are a large number of lateral click consonants; 17 occur in Taa language.

Lateral trills are also possible, but they do not occur in any known language. They may be pronounced by initiating [ɬ] or [ɮ] with an especially forceful airflow. There is no symbol for them in the IPA. They are sometimes used to imitate bird calls, and they are a component of Buccal speech.

== List of laterals ==
=== Approximants ===
- Voiced dental lateral approximant [l̪] (in Arabic, Chinese)
- Voiced alveolar lateral approximant [l] (in Dutch, English, Spanish)
- Voiced retroflex lateral approximant [ɭ] (in Dhivehi, Korean, Telegu, Tamil)
- Voiced palatal lateral approximant [ʎ] (in Aymara, Anindilyakwa)
- Voiced velar lateral approximant [ʟ] (in Wahgi)
- Voiced uvular lateral approximant [ʟ̠] (in some American dialects)

=== Fricatives ===
- Voiceless dental lateral fricative [ɬ̪] (in Wahgi)
- Voiced dental lateral fricative [ɮ̪] (allophonic in Wahgi)
- Voiceless alveolar lateral fricative [ɬ] (in Adyghe, Chukchi, Kabardian, Navajo, Welsh)
- Voiced alveolar lateral fricative [ɮ] (in Adyghe, Kabardian, Mongolian, Tigak)
- Voiceless retroflex lateral fricative [ꞎ] (in Toda)
- Voiced retroflex lateral fricative [ɭ˔] ([𝼅]) (in Ao)
- Voiceless palatal lateral fricative [𝼆] (in Dahalo, Inupiaq, Kumeyaay)
- Voiced palatal lateral fricative [ʎ̝] ([𝼆̬]) (allophonic in Jebero)
- Voiceless velar lateral fricative [𝼄] (in Archi, Nii, Wahgi)
- Voiced velar lateral fricative [ʟ̝] ([𝼄̬]) (in Archi, allophonic in Wahgi)

Only the alveolar lateral fricatives have dedicated letters in the IPA proper, though the retroflex letters are 'implied'. The others are provided by the extIPA.

- Voiceless lateral-median fricative [θ̠ˡ] or extIPA [ʪ] (in Al-Rubūʽah Arabic, Mehri)
- Voiced lateral-median fricative [ð̠ˡ] or extIPA [ʫ] (in Rijal Almaa Arabic, Mehri)

=== Affricates ===
- Voiceless alveolar lateral affricate [tɬ] (in Navajo, Tlingit and Icelandic)
- Voiced alveolar lateral affricate [dɮ] (allophonic in Zulu and Xhosa)
- Voiceless retroflex lateral affricate [ʈꞎ] (in Bhadrawahi)
- Voiced retroflex lateral affricate [ɖɭ˔] ([ɖ𝼅]) (in Bhadrawahi)
- Voiceless palatal lateral affricate [c𝼆] (perhaps prepalatal in Sandawe and Hadza)
- Voiced palatal lateral affricate [ɟʎ̝] (perhaps prepalatal in Sandawe)
- Voiceless velar lateral affricate [k𝼄] (in Archi, Laghuu, Muji)
- Voiced velar lateral affricate [ɡʟ̝] (in Hiw, Laghuu, Muji)

=== Flaps ===
- Voiceless alveolar lateral flap [ɺ̥] (in Yavitero, Baniwa of Içana)
- Voiced alveolar lateral flap [ɺ] (in Wayuu, Iwaidja)
- Voiceless retroflex lateral flap [𝼈̥] (allophonic in Wahgi)
- Voiced retroflex lateral flap [𝼈] (in Pashto, Iwaidja)
- Palatal lateral flap [ʎ̮] (allophonic in Iwaidja and Ilgar)
- Velar lateral flap [ʟ̆] (in Kanite and Melpa)

=== Ejective ===
==== Affricates ====
- Alveolar lateral ejective affricate [tɬʼ] (in Baslaney, Navajo, Tlingit)
- Palatal lateral ejective affricate [c𝼆ʼ] (in Dahalo, Sandawe, Hadza)
- Velar lateral ejective affricate [k𝼄ʼ] (in Archi, Gǀwi, Zulu)
- Uvular lateral ejective affricate [q𝼄̠ʼ] (in ǂʼAmkoe, Gǀwi)

==== Fricatives ====
- Alveolar lateral ejective fricative [ɬʼ] (in Adyghe, Kabardian, Tlingit)

=== Clicks ===
- Alveolar lateral clicks [ᵏǁ], [ᵏǁˀ], [ᵑ̊ǁʰ] etc. (in all five Khoisan families and several Bantu languages)

== Ambiguous laterality ==
The IPA requires sounds to be defined as to laterality, as either median or lateral. However, languages may be ambiguous as to some consonants' laterality. A well-known example is the liquid consonant in Japanese, represented in common transliteration systems as ⟨r⟩, which can be recognized as a (post)alveolar tap /ɾ/, alveolar lateral flap /ɺ/, (post)alveolar lateral approximant /l/, (post)alveolar approximant /ɹ/, voiced retroflex stop /ɖ/, and various less common forms.

== Lateralized consonants ==
A superscript ⟨ˡ⟩ is defined as lateral release.

Consonants may also be pronounced with simultaneous lateral and median airflow. This is well-known from speech pathology with a lateral lisp. However, it also occurs in nondisordered speech in some southern Arabic dialects and possibly some Modern South Arabian languages, which have pharyngealized nonsibilant /ʪ̪ˤ/ and /ʫ̪ˤ/ (simultaneous [θ͜ɬˤ] and [ð͡ɮˤ]) and possibly a sibilant /ʪ/ (simultaneous [s͜ɬ]). Examples are /θˡˤaim/ 'pain' in the dialect of Al-Rubūʽah and /ðˡˤahr/ 'back' and /ðˡˤabʕ/ 'hyena' in Rijal Almaʽa. (Here the ⟨ˡ⟩ indicates simultaneous laterality rather than lateral release.) Biblical Hebrew may have had non-emphatic median-lateral sibilants [ʃ͡ɬ] and [s͜ɬ], while Old Arabic has been analyzed as having the emphatic median–lateral fricatives [θ͜ɬˤ], [ð͡ɮˤ] and [ʃ͡ɬˤ].

== See also ==
- Delateralization
- Lateral release (phonetics)
- List of phonetics topics

== Notes ==
Place →	Labial					Coronal										Dorsal					Laryngeal			
Manner ↓	Bilabial		Labiodental		Linguolabial		Dental		Alveolar		Postalveolar		Retroflex		(Alveolo-)palatal		Velar		Uvular		Pharyngeal/epiglottal		Glottal	
Nasal	m̥	m	ɱ̊	ɱ		n̼	n̪̊	n̪	n̥	n	n̠̊	n̠	ɳ̊	ɳ	ɲ̊	ɲ	ŋ̊	ŋ	ɴ̥	ɴ				
Plosive	p	b	p̪	b̪	t̼	d̼	t̪	d̪	t	d			ʈ	ɖ	c	ɟ	k	ɡ	q	ɢ	ʡ		ʔ	
Sibilant affricate							ts̪	dz̪	ts	dz	tʃ	dʒ	tʂ	dʐ	tɕ	dʑ								
Non-sibilant affricate	pɸ	bβ	p̪f	b̪v			tθ	dð	tɹ̝̊	dɹ̝	t̠ɹ̝̊	d̠ɹ̝			cç	ɟʝ	kx	ɡɣ	qχ	ɢʁ	ʡʜ	ʡʢ	ʔh	
Sibilant fricative							s̪	z̪	s	z	ʃ	ʒ	ʂ	ʐ	ɕ	ʑ								
Non-sibilant fricative	ɸ	β	f	v	θ̼	ð̼	θ	ð	θ̠	ð̠	ɹ̝̠̊	ɹ̠᷵	ɻ̥᷵	ɻ᷵	ç	ʝ	x	ɣ	χ	ʁ	ħ	ʕ	h	ɦ
Approximant		β̞		ʋ				ð̞		ɹ		ɹ̠		ɻ		j		ɰ						˷
Tap/flap		ⱱ̟		ⱱ					ɾ̥	ɾ			ɽ̊	ɽ						ɢ̆		ʡ̆		
Trill	ʙ̥	ʙ							r̥	r		r̠	ɽ̊r̥	ɽr					ʀ̥	ʀ	ʜ	ʢ		
Lateral affricate									tɬ	dɮ			tꞎ	d𝼅	c𝼆	ɟʎ̝	k𝼄	ɡʟ̝						
Lateral fricative							ɬ̪		ɬ	ɮ			ꞎ	𝼅	𝼆	ʎ̝	𝼄	ʟ̝						
Lateral approximant								l̪	l̥	l		l̠	ɭ̊	ɭ	ʎ̥	ʎ	ʟ̥	ʟ		ʟ̠				
Lateral tap/flap									ɺ̥	ɺ			𝼈̊	𝼈		ʎ̆		ʟ̆						

		BL	LD	D	A	PA	RF	P	V	U
Implosive	Voiced	ɓ			ɗ		ᶑ	ʄ	ɠ	ʛ
Implosive	Voiceless	ɓ̥			ɗ̥		ᶑ̊	ʄ̊	ɠ̊	ʛ̥
Ejective	Stop	pʼ			tʼ		ʈʼ	cʼ	kʼ	qʼ
Ejective	Affricate		p̪fʼ	tθʼ	tsʼ	tʃʼ	tʂʼ	tɕʼ	kxʼ	qχʼ
Ejective	Fricative	ɸʼ	fʼ	θʼ	sʼ	ʃʼ	ʂʼ	ɕʼ	xʼ	χʼ
Ejective	Lateral affricate				tɬʼ			c𝼆ʼ	k𝼄ʼ	q𝼄ʼ
Ejective	Lateral fricative				ɬʼ					
Click (top: velar; bottom: uvular)	Tenuis	kʘ qʘ		kǀ qǀ	kǃ qǃ		k𝼊 q𝼊	kǂ qǂ		
Click (top: velar; bottom: uvular)	Voiced	ɡʘ ɢʘ		ɡǀ ɢǀ	ɡǃ ɢǃ		ɡ𝼊 ɢ𝼊	ɡǂ ɢǂ		
Click (top: velar; bottom: uvular)	Nasal	ŋʘ ɴʘ		ŋǀ ɴǀ	ŋǃ ɴǃ		ŋ𝼊 ɴ𝼊	ŋǂ ɴǂ	ʞ	
Click (top: velar; bottom: uvular)	Tenuis lateral				kǁ qǁ					
Click (top: velar; bottom: uvular)	Voiced lateral				ɡǁ ɢǁ					
Click (top: velar; bottom: uvular)	Nasal lateral				ŋǁ ɴǁ					
