= Voiceless palatal lateral fricative =

Consonantal sound represented by ⟨𝼆⟩ or ⟨ʎ̝̊⟩ in IPA

𝼆

ʎ̥˔

Audio sample
- source · help

Encoding
- Entity (decimal): &#122630;
- Unicode (hex): U+1DF06
- X-SAMPA: L_0_r
Image

Voiceless palatal lateral approximant

ʎ̥
- IPA number: 157 402A

Encoding
- X-SAMPA: L_0

Voiceless alveolo-palatal lateral fricative

ɬ̠ʲ

Voiceless alveolo-palatal lateral approximant

l̠̊ʲ

A voiceless palatal lateral fricative is a type of consonantal sound, used in a few spoken languages. This sound is somewhat rare; Dahalo has both a palatal lateral fricative and an affricate; Hadza has a series of palatal lateral affricates. In Bura, it is the realization of palatalized /ɬʲ/ and contrasts with [ʎ].

The extensions to the IPA transcribes this sound with the letter ⟨𝼆⟩ (⟨ʎ⟩ with a belt, analogous to ⟨ɬ⟩ for the voiceless alveolar lateral fricative), which was added to Unicode in 2021. Some scholars also posit a voiceless palatal lateral approximant distinct from the fricative. The approximant may be represented in the IPA as ⟨ʎ̥⟩.

If distinction is necessary, a voiceless alveolo-palatal lateral fricative may be transcribed as ⟨ɬ̠ʲ⟩ (retracted and palatalized ⟨ɬ⟩) or as advanced ⟨𝼆̟⟩; these are essentially equivalent. The approximant also occurs and can be represented as ⟨l̠̊ʲ⟩ or ⟨ʎ̥˖⟩.

== Features ==
Features of the voiceless palatal lateral fricative:

- Its manner of articulation is fricative, which means it is produced by constricting air flow through a narrow channel at the place of articulation, causing turbulence.
- Its place of articulation is palatal, which means it is articulated with the middle or back part of the tongue raised to the hard palate.
- Its phonation is voiceless, which means it is produced without vibrations of the vocal cords.
- It is an oral consonant, which means that air is not allowed to escape through the nose.
- It is a lateral consonant, which means it is produced by directing the airstream over the sides of the tongue, rather than down the middle.
- Its airstream mechanism is pulmonic, which means it is articulated by pushing air only with the intercostal muscles and abdominal muscles, as in most speech sounds.

== Occurrence ==
=== Palatal ===
Language		Word	IPA	Meaning	Notes
Bura					Contrasts with /l, ʎ, ɬ, ɮ, ʎ̝̊/.
Dahalo		[𝼆aːbu]		'leaf'	Contrasts with [ɬ] and [ɬʷ]
Faroese		kjálki	[ˈt͡ʃʰaʎ̥t͡ʃɪ]	'jaw'	Allophone of /l/. See Faroese phonology
Inupiaq		sikł̣aq	[sik𝼆̟ɑq]	'pickaxe'	Alveolo-palatal; also described as an approximant. Contrasts with voiceless /ɬ/ and voiced /ʎ/ and /l/.
Inupiaq		nuiŋił̣ł̣uni	[nuiŋi𝼆̟ːuni]	'because it did not appear'	Alveolo-palatal; also described as an approximant. Contrasts with voiceless /ɬ/ and voiced /ʎ/ and /l/.
Kumeyaay		kałyəxwiiw	[kɑ𝼆əxʷeːw]	'skunk'	Rare in word-initial position. Contrasts with voiceless /ɬ/ and voiced /ʎ/ and /l/.
Mochica	17th century	xllac	[𝼆ak]	'fish'	Alternative realizations have been proposed. Shifted to [ç] in the 18th and 19th centuries.
Norwegian	Trondheim subdialect of Trøndersk	alt	[ɑʎ̥c]	'everything, all'	Allophone of /ʎ/ before /c/. See Norwegian phonology
Norwegian	Some subdialects of Trøndersk	tatle	[tɑʎ̥]	'acting silly'	According to some scholars, it is a phoneme that contrasts with /ʎ/ (as in /tɑʎ/ 'softwood'.) See Norwegian phonology
Scottish Gaelic		coilltean	[ˈkʰɤiʎ̥tʲən]	'woods'	Allophone of /ʎ/ before /tʲʰ/.
Turkish		dil	[ˈd̟iʎ̟̊]	'tongue'	Devoiced allophone of alveolo-palatal /l/, frequent finally and before voiceless consonants. See Turkish phonology
Xumi	Lower	[ʎ̥˖o˦]		'spirit'	Described as an approximant. Alveolo-palatal; contrasts with the voiced /ʎ/.
Xumi	Upper	[ʎ̥˖ɛ˦]		'flavorless'	Described as an approximant. Alveolo-palatal; contrasts with the voiced /ʎ/.

=== Post-palatal ===
Voiceless post-palatal or pre-velar lateral fricative

𝼆̠

𝼄̟

Archi, a Northeast Caucasian language of Dagestan, has four voiceless palatal lateral fricatives: plain [𝼆], labialized [𝼆ʷ], fortis [𝼆ː], and labialized fortis [𝼆ːʷ]. Although clearly fricatives, these are further back than palatals in most languages, but further forward than velars in most languages, and might better be called post-palatal or pre-velar. Archi also has a voiced fricative, as well as a voiceless and several ejective lateral velar affricates, but no alveolar lateral fricatives or affricates.

Language	Word	IPA	Meaning	Notes
Archi	лъат	[𝼄̟at]	'sea'	Pre-velar.

== See also ==
- Index of phonetics articles

Place →	Labial					Coronal										Dorsal					Laryngeal			
Manner ↓	Bilabial		Labiodental		Linguolabial		Dental		Alveolar		Postalveolar		Retroflex		(Alveolo-)palatal		Velar		Uvular		Pharyngeal/epiglottal		Glottal	
Nasal	m̥	m	ɱ̊	ɱ		n̼	n̪̊	n̪	n̥	n	n̠̊	n̠	ɳ̊	ɳ	ɲ̊	ɲ	ŋ̊	ŋ	ɴ̥	ɴ				
Plosive	p	b	p̪	b̪	t̼	d̼	t̪	d̪	t	d			ʈ	ɖ	c	ɟ	k	ɡ	q	ɢ	ʡ		ʔ	
Sibilant affricate							t̪s̪	d̪z̪	ts	dz	t̠ʃ	d̠ʒ	tʂ	dʐ	tɕ	dʑ								
Non-sibilant affricate	pɸ	bβ	p̪f	b̪v			t̪θ	d̪ð	tɹ̝̊	dɹ̝	t̠ɹ̠̊˔	d̠ɹ̠˔			cç	ɟʝ	kx	ɡɣ	qχ	ɢʁ	ʡʜ	ʡʢ	ʔh	
Sibilant fricative							s̪	z̪	s	z	ʃ	ʒ	ʂ	ʐ	ɕ	ʑ								
Non-sibilant fricative	ɸ	β	f	v	θ̼	ð̼	θ	ð	θ̠	ð̠	ɹ̠̊˔	ɹ̠˔	ɻ̊˔	ɻ˔	ç	ʝ	x	ɣ	χ	ʁ	ħ	ʕ	h	ɦ
Approximant		β̞		ʋ				ð̞		ɹ		ɹ̠		ɻ		j		ɰ						˷
Tap/flap		ⱱ̟		ⱱ					ɾ̥	ɾ			ɽ̊	ɽ						ɢ̆		ʡ̆		
Trill	ʙ̥	ʙ							r̥	r		r̠	ɽ̊r̥	ɽr					ʀ̥	ʀ	ʜ	ʢ		
Lateral affricate									tɬ	dɮ			tꞎ	d𝼅	c𝼆	ɟʎ̝	k𝼄	ɡʟ̝						
Lateral fricative							ɬ̪		ɬ	ɮ			ꞎ	𝼅	𝼆	ʎ̝	𝼄	ʟ̝						
Lateral approximant								l̪	l̥	l		l̠	ɭ̊	ɭ	ʎ̥	ʎ	ʟ̥	ʟ		ʟ̠				
Lateral tap/flap									ɺ̥	ɺ			𝼈̊	𝼈		ʎ̆		ʟ̆						

		BL	LD	D	A	PA	RF	P	V	U
Implosive	Voiced	ɓ			ɗ		ᶑ	ʄ	ɠ	ʛ
Implosive	Voiceless	ɓ̥			ɗ̥		ᶑ̊	ʄ̊	ɠ̊	ʛ̥
Ejective	Stop	pʼ			tʼ		ʈʼ	cʼ	kʼ	qʼ
Ejective	Affricate		p̪fʼ	tθʼ	tsʼ	tʃʼ	tʂʼ	tɕʼ	kxʼ	qχʼ
Ejective	Fricative	ɸʼ	fʼ	θʼ	sʼ	ʃʼ	ʂʼ	ɕʼ	xʼ	χʼ
Ejective	Lateral affricate				tɬʼ			c𝼆ʼ	k𝼄ʼ	q𝼄ʼ
Ejective	Lateral fricative				ɬʼ					
Click (top: velar; bottom: uvular)	Tenuis	kʘ qʘ		kǀ qǀ	kǃ qǃ		k𝼊 q𝼊	kǂ qǂ		
Click (top: velar; bottom: uvular)	Voiced	ɡʘ ɢʘ		ɡǀ ɢǀ	ɡǃ ɢǃ		ɡ𝼊 ɢ𝼊	ɡǂ ɢǂ		
Click (top: velar; bottom: uvular)	Nasal	ŋʘ ɴʘ		ŋǀ ɴǀ	ŋǃ ɴǃ		ŋ𝼊 ɴ𝼊	ŋǂ ɴǂ	ʞ	
Click (top: velar; bottom: uvular)	Tenuis lateral				kǁ qǁ					
Click (top: velar; bottom: uvular)	Voiced lateral				ɡǁ ɢǁ					
Click (top: velar; bottom: uvular)	Nasal lateral				ŋǁ ɴǁ					
