= Intrative case =

Grammatical case

The intrative case (abbreviated ITRT) is a case that roughly expresses the notion of the English prepositions "amidst" or "between".

It is found in the Limbu language, where it occurs with the locative suffix -ʼō. When conjoined, the two morphemes are pronounced as -lummō.

anchi-lum-ʼō mi nɛ̄
1DU.IN-ITRT-LOC fire be.situated
"There is a fire between us two."

It is also found in the Archi language, where it is marked with the affix -хъI(а-) (qˤ(a-)).
