= Voiced dental and alveolar lateral fricatives =

Consonantal sounds represented by ⟨ɮ⟩ in IPA

Voiced alveolar lateral fricative

ɮ
- IPA number: 149

Audio sample
- source · help

Encoding
- Entity (decimal): &#622;
- Unicode (hex): U+026E
- X-SAMPA: K\
- Braille: ⠇ (braille pattern dots-123) ⠐ (braille pattern dots-5) ⠮ (braille pattern dots-2346)
Image

Voiced dental lateral fricative

ɮ̪
- IPA number: 149 408

Voiced postalveolar lateral fricative

ɮ̠
- IPA number: 149 414

Audio sample
- source · help

A voiced alveolar lateral fricative is a type of consonantal sound, used in some spoken languages.

== Notation ==
Former style of the IPA letter for a voiced alveolar lateral fricative

The symbol in the International Phonetic Alphabet that represents voiced dental, alveolar, and postalveolar lateral fricatives is ⟨ɮ⟩, sometimes referred to as lezh.

In 1938, a symbol shaped similarly to heng ⟨ꜧ⟩ was approved as the official IPA symbol for the voiced alveolar lateral fricative, replacing ⟨ɮ⟩. It was suggested at the same time, however, that a compromise shaped like something between the two may also be used at the author's discretion. It was this compromise version, ⟨⟩, that was included in the 1949 Principles of the International Phonetic Association and the subsequent IPA charts, until it was replaced again by ⟨ɮ⟩ at the 1989 Kiel Convention. Despite the Association's prescription, ⟨ɮ⟩ is nonetheless seen in literature from the 1960s to the 1980s.

=== Related characters ===
There are several Unicode characters based on lezh (ɮ):

- U+1079E 𐞞 MODIFIER LETTER SMALL LEZH is a superscript IPA letter
- U+1079F 𐞟 MODIFIER LETTER SMALL LEZH WITH RETROFLEX HOOK is a superscript IPA letter
- U+1DF05 𝼅 LATIN SMALL LETTER LEZH WITH RETROFLEX HOOK is an extension to IPA for disordered speech (extIPA)

== Features ==
Features of a voiced alveolar lateral fricative:

- Its manner of articulation is fricative, which means it is produced by constricting air flow through a narrow channel at the place of articulation, causing turbulence.
- Its place of articulation is alveolar, which means it is articulated with either the tip or the blade of the tongue at the alveolar ridge, termed respectively apical and laminal.
- Its phonation is voiced, which means the vocal cords vibrate during the articulation.
- It is an oral consonant, which means that air is not allowed to escape through the nose.
- It is a lateral consonant, which means it is produced by directing the airstream over the sides of the tongue, rather than down the middle.
- Its airstream mechanism is pulmonic, which means it is articulated by pushing air only with the intercostal muscles and abdominal muscles, as in most speech sounds.

== Occurrence ==
=== Dental or denti-alveolar ===
Language		Word	IPA	Meaning	Notes
Amis	Kangko	ada	[ʔaɮ̟aʔ]	'enemy'	May be realized as denti-alveolar [ɮ̟] or interdental [ɮ̪͆]. Corresponds to [ð̪] in the Fengpin dialect.

=== Alveolar ===
Language		Word	IPA	Meaning	Notes
Adyghe		къалэ	[qaːɮa]	'town'	Can also be pronounced as [l]
Bura		dlambà	[ɮamba]	'cloud'	Contrasts with [ɬ] and [𝼆].
English	South African	ibandla	[iˈbaːnɮa]	'meeting of a Nguni chief or community'	Only found in Zulu loan words in South African English.
Kabalan		dedan	[ɮəˈan]	'sky'	
Kabardian		блы	[bɮə]	'seven'	Can also be pronounced as [l]
Ket		олын	[ɔɮɨn]	'nose'	Can also be pronounced as [l]
Moloko		zlan	[ɮàŋ]	'start, begin'	Contrasts with [ɬ], [l] and [ʒ]
Mongolian		чулуу	[tʃʊɮʊː]	'stone'	Devoiced to [ɬ] at the end of a word or when surrounded by voiceless consonants
Pinuyumayan		lrevek	[ɮəˈvək]	'tooth'	Puyuma dialect doesn't have the sound.
Sassarese		caldhu	[ˈkaɮdu]	'hot'	
Tera		dlepti	[ɮè̞pti]	'planting'	Contrasts with both [ɬ] and [l]
Truku		lukus	['ɮukus]	'clothes'	
Zulu		ukudla	[úɠùːɮá]	'to eat'	Contrasts with both [ɬ] and [l]; realized as [dɮ] after nasals

== Voiced lateral–median fricative ==
Voiced alveolar lateral–median fricative

ʫ

ð̠ˡ

Audio sample
- source · help
Image

Voiced dental lateral–median fricative

ʫ̪

ðˡ

The voiced alveolar lateral–median fricative (also known as a "lisp" fricative) is a consonantal sound pronounced with simultaneous lateral and central airflow.

=== Features ===
- Its manner of articulation is fricative, which means it is produced by constricting air flow through a narrow channel at the place of articulation, causing turbulence. However, it does not have the grooved tongue and directed airflow, or the high frequencies, of a sibilant.
- Its place of articulation is alveolar, which means it is articulated with either the tip or the blade of the tongue at the alveolar ridge, termed respectively apical and laminal.
- Its phonation is voiced, which means the vocal cords vibrate during the articulation.
- It is an oral consonant, which means that air is not allowed to escape through the nose.
- It is a median consonant, which means it is produced by directing the airstream down the midline of the tongue, rather than to the sides.
- It is a lateral consonant, which means it is produced by directing the airstream over the sides of the tongue, rather than down the middle.
- Its airstream mechanism is pulmonic, which means it is articulated by pushing air only with the intercostal muscles and abdominal muscles, as in most speech sounds.

=== Occurrence ===
Language	Word	IPA	Meaning	Notes
Arabic	ضَبْعْ	[ðˡˤabʕ]	'hyena'	Classical Arabic [ɮˁ] and Modern Standard Arabic [dˤ]
Mehri	ذوفر	[ðˡˤoːfar]	'plait'	

== See also ==
- Index of phonetics articles
- Voiceless alveolar lateral fricative
- Ḍād

== Notes ==
Place →	Labial					Coronal										Dorsal					Laryngeal			
Manner ↓	Bilabial		Labiodental		Linguolabial		Dental		Alveolar		Postalveolar		Retroflex		(Alveolo-)palatal		Velar		Uvular		Pharyngeal/epiglottal		Glottal	
Nasal	m̥	m	ɱ̊	ɱ		n̼	n̪̊	n̪	n̥	n	n̠̊	n̠	ɳ̊	ɳ	ɲ̊	ɲ	ŋ̊	ŋ	ɴ̥	ɴ				
Plosive	p	b	p̪	b̪	t̼	d̼	t̪	d̪	t	d			ʈ	ɖ	c	ɟ	k	ɡ	q	ɢ	ʡ		ʔ	
Sibilant affricate							t̪s̪	d̪z̪	ts	dz	t̠ʃ	d̠ʒ	tʂ	dʐ	tɕ	dʑ								
Non-sibilant affricate	pɸ	bβ	p̪f	b̪v			t̪θ	d̪ð	tɹ̝̊	dɹ̝	t̠ɹ̠̊˔	d̠ɹ̠˔			cç	ɟʝ	kx	ɡɣ	qχ	ɢʁ	ʡʜ	ʡʢ	ʔh	
Sibilant fricative							s̪	z̪	s	z	ʃ	ʒ	ʂ	ʐ	ɕ	ʑ								
Non-sibilant fricative	ɸ	β	f	v	θ̼	ð̼	θ	ð	θ̠	ð̠	ɹ̠̊˔	ɹ̠˔	ɻ̊˔	ɻ˔	ç	ʝ	x	ɣ	χ	ʁ	ħ	ʕ	h	ɦ
Approximant		β̞		ʋ				ð̞		ɹ		ɹ̠		ɻ		j		ɰ						˷
Tap/flap		ⱱ̟		ⱱ					ɾ̥	ɾ			ɽ̊	ɽ						ɢ̆		ʡ̆		
Trill	ʙ̥	ʙ							r̥	r		r̠	ɽ̊r̥	ɽr					ʀ̥	ʀ	ʜ	ʢ		
Lateral affricate									tɬ	dɮ			tꞎ	d𝼅	c𝼆	ɟʎ̝	k𝼄	ɡʟ̝						
Lateral fricative							ɬ̪		ɬ	ɮ			ꞎ	𝼅	𝼆	ʎ̝	𝼄	ʟ̝						
Lateral approximant								l̪	l̥	l		l̠	ɭ̊	ɭ	ʎ̥	ʎ	ʟ̥	ʟ		ʟ̠				
Lateral tap/flap									ɺ̥	ɺ			𝼈̊	𝼈		ʎ̆		ʟ̆						

		BL	LD	D	A	PA	RF	P	V	U
Implosive	Voiced	ɓ			ɗ		ᶑ	ʄ	ɠ	ʛ
Implosive	Voiceless	ɓ̥			ɗ̥		ᶑ̊	ʄ̊	ɠ̊	ʛ̥
Ejective	Stop	pʼ			tʼ		ʈʼ	cʼ	kʼ	qʼ
Ejective	Affricate		p̪fʼ	t̪θʼ	tsʼ	t̠ʃʼ	tʂʼ	tɕʼ	kxʼ	qχʼ
Ejective	Fricative	ɸʼ	fʼ	θʼ	sʼ	ʃʼ	ʂʼ	ɕʼ	xʼ	χʼ
Ejective	Lateral affricate				tɬʼ			c𝼆ʼ	k𝼄ʼ	q𝼄ʼ
Ejective	Lateral fricative				ɬʼ					
Click (top: velar; bottom: uvular)	Tenuis	kʘ qʘ		kǀ qǀ	kǃ qǃ		k𝼊 q𝼊	kǂ qǂ		
Click (top: velar; bottom: uvular)	Voiced	ɡʘ ɢʘ		ɡǀ ɢǀ	ɡǃ ɢǃ		ɡ𝼊 ɢ𝼊	ɡǂ ɢǂ		
Click (top: velar; bottom: uvular)	Nasal	ŋʘ ɴʘ		ŋǀ ɴǀ	ŋǃ ɴǃ		ŋ𝼊 ɴ𝼊	ŋǂ ɴǂ	ʞ	
Click (top: velar; bottom: uvular)	Tenuis lateral				kǁ qǁ					
Click (top: velar; bottom: uvular)	Voiced lateral				ɡǁ ɢǁ					
Click (top: velar; bottom: uvular)	Nasal lateral				ŋǁ ɴǁ					
