= Archi language =

Lezgic language spoken in southern Russia

Archi
- аршаттен чӀат / aršatten čʼat
- Native to: Russia
- Region: Archib, Dagestan
- Ethnicity: Archi people
- Native speakers: 1,712 (2020 census)
- Language family: Northeast Caucasian: Lezgic; Archi
- Writing system: Cyrillic script (developed in 2006 based on the Avar alphabet); Arabic script (19th century)

Language codes
- ISO 639-3: aqc
- Glottolog: arch1244
- ELP: Archi
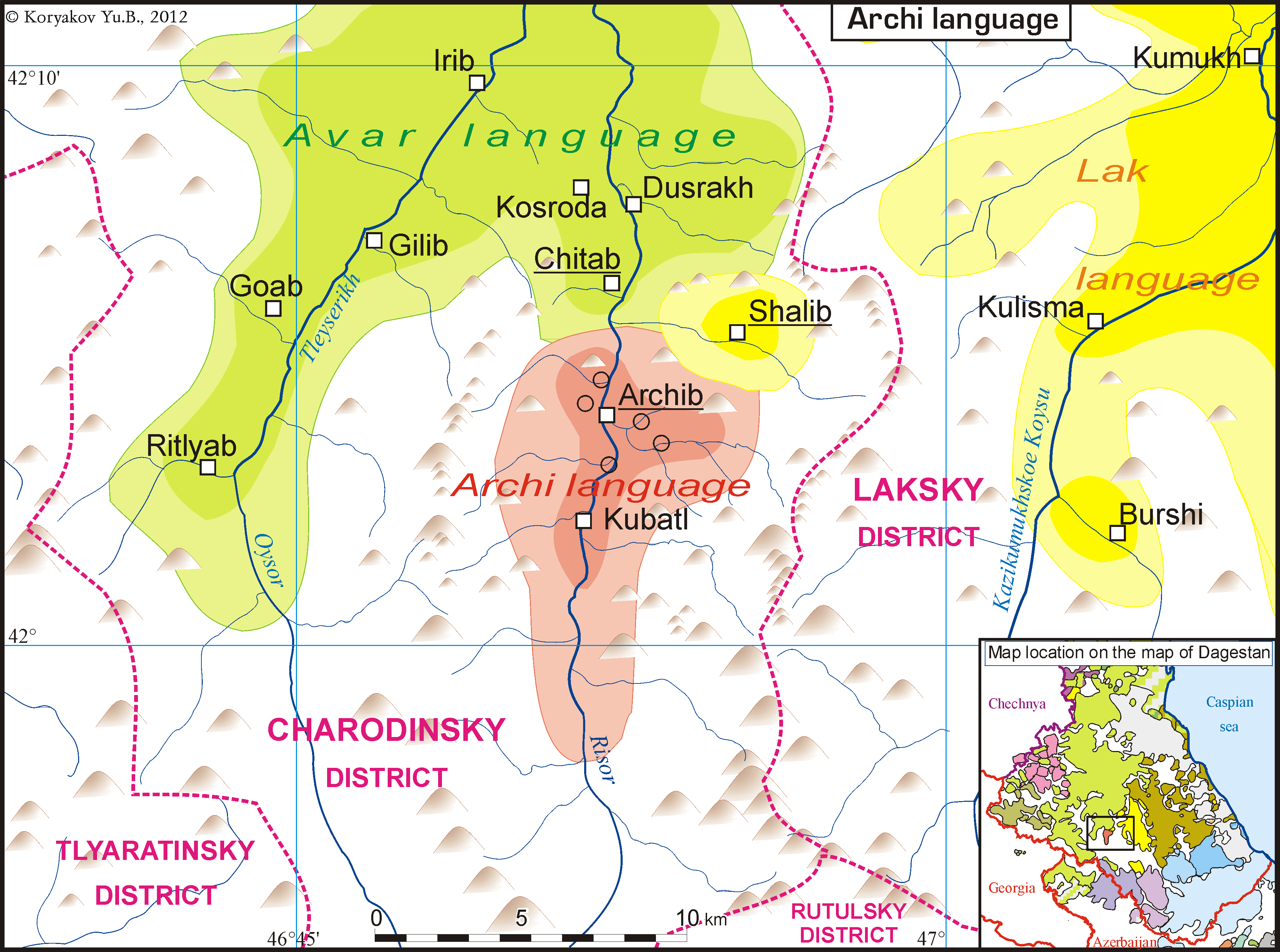
- Map of where Archi is spoken (red area)

- Archi is classified as Definitely Endangered by the UNESCO Atlas of the World's Languages in Danger (2010)

Archi (/ɑːrˈtʃiː/, ar-CHEE) is a Northeast Caucasian language spoken by the Archis in the village of Archib, southern Dagestan, Russia, and the six surrounding smaller villages.

It is unusual for its many phonemes and for its contrast between several voiceless velar lateral fricatives, /𝼄, 𝼄ʷ, 𝼄ː, 𝼄ʷː/, tenuis and ejective velar lateral affricates, /k͡𝼄, k͡𝼄ʷ, k͡𝼄ʼ, k͡𝼄ʷʼ/, and a voiced velar lateral fricative, /ʟ̝/. It is an ergative–absolutive language with four noun classes and has a morphological system with irregularities on all levels. Mathematically, there are 1,502,839 possible forms that can be derived from a single verb root.

== Classification ==
The classification of the Archi language has not been definitively established. Peter von Uslar felt it should be considered a variant of Avar, but Roderich von Erckert saw it as closer to Lak. The language has also been considered as a separate entity that could be placed somewhere between Avar and Lak. The Italian linguist Alfredo Trombetti placed Archi within an Avar–Ando–Dido group, but today the most widely recognized opinion follows that of the Soviet scholar Bokarev, who regards Archi as one of the Lezgian–Samur group of the Dagestan languages. Schulze places it in the Lezgian branch with all other Lezgian languages belonging to the Samur group.

== Phonology ==
Archi has, like its Northeast Caucasian relatives, a very complicated phonological system, with Archi being an extreme example. It has 26 vowel phonemes and, depending on analysis, between 74 and 82 consonant phonemes.

=== Vowels ===
Archi has a symmetric six-vowel system (/i e ə a o u/).

Vowel phonemes of Archi
| | Front | Central | Back |
|---|---|---|---|
| Close | i iː | | u uː |
| Mid | e eː | ə | o oː |
| Open | | a aː | |

All vowels except for /ə/ can occur in five varieties: short, pharyngealized, high tone, long (with high tone), and pharyngealized with high tone (e.g. /a/, /aˤ/, /á/, /áː/, and /áˤ/). Of all these, only /ə/ and /íˤ/ do not occur word-initially. Examples of non-initial /íˤ/ are /díˤt͡ʃa/ ('to be fat') and /iˤntíˤmmaj/ ('brain').

=== Consonants ===
Of all living languages, Archi has the world's largest phonemic non-click consonant inventory, with only the recently extinct Ubykh of the Northwest Caucasian languages having a few more. The table below shows all consonants that can be found in the Archi Language Tutorial and the Archi Dictionary.

Consonant phonemes of Archi
| | | | Labial | Dental | | Post- alveolar | | Pre-velar | | Uvular | | | | Epiglottal | Glottal |
| | | | Labial | plain | lab. | plain | lab. | plain | lab. | plain | lab. | phar. | phar.+lab. | Epiglottal | Glottal |
|---|---|---|---|---|---|---|---|---|---|---|---|---|---|---|---|
| Nasal | | | m | n | | | | | | | | | | | |
| Plosive | voiced | | b | d | dʷ^{2} | | | ɡ᫈ | ɡ᫈ʷ | | | | | | |
| Plosive | voiceless | | p | t | tʷ | | | k̟ | k̟ʷ | q | qʷ | qˤ | qˤʷ | ʡ | ʔ^{1} |
| Plosive | fortis | | pː^{1} | tː^{1} | | | | k̟ː^{1} | k̟ʷː^{2} | qʼː^{1} | | qˤʼː | | | |
| Plosive | ejective | | pʼ | tʼ | | | | k̟ʼ | k̟ʷʼ | qʼ | qʷʼ | qˤʼ | qˤʷʼ | | |
| Affricate | voiceless | lenis | | t͡s | t͡sʷ^{2} | t͡ʃ | t͡ʃʷ | k̟͡𝼄 | k̟͡𝼄ʷ | | | | | | |
| Affricate | voiceless | fortis | | t͡sː^{3} | | | | | | | | | | | |
| Affricate | ejective | lenis | | t͡sʼ | t͡sʷʼ | t͡ʃʼ | t͡ʃʷʼ | k̟͡𝼄ʼ | k̟͡𝼄ʷʼ | | | | | | |
| Affricate | ejective | fortis | | t͡sʼː^{1} | | t͡ʃʼː^{2} | | | | | | | | | |
| Fricative | voiceless | lenis | | s | sʷ^{2} | ʃ | ʃʷ | 𝼄̟ | 𝼄̟ʷ | χ | χʷ | χˤ | χˤʷ | | h |
| Fricative | voiceless | fortis | | sː | sʷː^{2} | ʃː | ʃʷː | 𝼄̟ː | 𝼄̟ʷː | χː | χʷː | χˤː | χˤʷː | | |
| Fricative | voiced | | | z | zʷ | ʒ | ʒʷ | ʟ̟᷵^{1} | | ʁ | ʁʷ^{2} | ʁˤ | ʁˤʷ | | |
| Trill | | | | r | | | | | | | | | | ʜ | |
| Approximant | | | | l | | j | | | w | | | | | | |

1. These have no word-initial dictionary entries (even though /pː/, /tː/, and /k̟ː/ are relatively common).
2. These appear in the Tutorial but have no dictionary entries.
3. This does not appear in the Tutorial but does have a word-internal dictionary entry (in /mot͡sːór/, 'alpine pasture used in summer').

Some of these sounds are very rare. For example, /ʁˤʷ/ has only one dictionary entry word-internally (in /íʁˤʷdut/, 'heavy') and two entries word-initially. Likewise, /ʟ̟᷵/ has only two dictionary entries: /náʟ̝dut/ ('blue; unripe') and /k͡𝼄ʼéʟ̝dut/ ('crooked, curved').

The fortis consonants are not simply two instances of the same consonant, though they do appear largely complementary, with the double instances /mm/, /ll/, and /nn/ being the most common and /zz/ less so. That said, /pp/ can still be found in /𝼄íppu/ ('three'). This is also noted by Kodzasov (1977), who describes the fortis consonants as follows:

"Strong phonemes are characterized by the intensiveness (tension) of the articulation. The intensity of the pronunciation leads to a natural lengthening of the duration of the sound, and that is why strong [consonants] differ from weak ones by greater length. [However,] the adjoining of two single weak sounds does not produce a strong one […] Thus, the gemination of a sound does not by itself create its tension."

The voiceless velar lateral fricative /𝼄/, the voiced velar lateral fricative /ʟ̝/, and the corresponding voiceless and ejective affricates /k͡𝼄/, /k͡𝼄ʼ/ are extremely unusual speech sounds among the languages of the world, because velar fricatives are usually median rather than lateral. The velar laterals are further forward than velars in most languages and could better be called prevelar, like the Tutorial does.

== Orthography ==
Until recently Archi did not have a written form, except in studies by specialists who used the Latin script. In 2006, the Surrey Morphology Group developed a Cyrillic alphabet for Archi based on the Avar alphabet, which is used in the Archi–Russian–English Dictionary alongside an IPA transcription.

Practical orthography of Archi by SMG
| А а /a/ | АӀ аӀ /aˤ/ | А́ а́ /á/ | А́а а́а /áː/ | А́Ӏ а́Ӏ /áˤ/ | Ы ы /ə/ | Б б /b/ |
| В в /w/ | Г г /g/ | Гв гв /gʷ/ | Гъ гъ /ʁ/ | Гъв гъв /ʁʷ/ | ГъӀ гъӀ /ʁˤ/ | ГъӀв гъӀв /ʁˤʷ/ |
| Гь гь /h/ | ГӀ гӀ /ʡ/ | Д д /d/ | Дв дв /dʷ/ | Е е /e/ | ЕӀ еӀ /eˤ/ | Е́ е́ /é/ |
| Е́е е́е /éː/ | Е́Ӏ е́Ӏ /éˤ/ | Ж ж /ʒ/ | Жв жв /ʒʷ/ | З з /z/ | Зв зв /zʷ/ | И и /i/ |
| ИӀ иӀ /iˤ/ | И́ и́ /í/ | И́и и́и /íː/ | И́Ӏ и́Ӏ /íˤ/ | Й й /j/ | К к /k/ | Кв кв /kʷ/ |
| Кк кк /kː/ | Ккв ккв /kʷː/ | Ккъ ккъ /qʼː/ | КкъӀ ккъӀ /qˤʼː/ | Къ къ /qʼ/ | Къв къв /qʷʼ/ | КъӀ къӀ /qˤʼ/ |
| КъӀв къӀв /qˤʷʼ/ | Кь кь /k͡𝼄ʼ/, /ʟ̝/ | Кьв кьв /k͡𝼄ʷʼ/ | КӀ кӀ /kʼ/ | КӀв кӀв /kʷʼ/ | Л л /l/ | Ллъ ллъ /𝼄ː/ |
| Ллъв ллъв /𝼄ʷː/ | Лъ лъ /𝼄/ | Лъв лъв /𝼄ʷ/ | ЛӀ лӀ /k͡𝼄/ | ЛӀв лӀв /k͡𝼄ʷ/ | М м /m/ | Н н /n/ |
| О о /o/ | ОӀ оӀ /oˤ/ | О́ о́ /ó/ | О́о о́о /óː/ | О́Ӏ о́Ӏ /óˤ/ | П п /p/ | Пп пп /pː/ |
| ПӀ пӀ /pʼ/ | Р р /r/ | С с /s/ | Св св /sʷ/ | Сс сс /sː/ | Ссв ссв /sʷː/ | Т т /t/ |
| Тв тв /tʷ/ | Тт тт /tː/ | ТӀ тӀ /tʼ/ | У у /u/ | УӀ уӀ /uˤ/ | У́ у́ /ú/ | У́у у́у /úː/ |
| У́Ӏ у́Ӏ /úˤ/ | Х х /χ/ | Хв хв /χʷ/ | Хх хх /χː/ | Ххв ххв /χʷː/ | ХхьӀ ххьӀ /χˤː/ | ХхьӀв ххьӀв /χˤʷː/ |
| Хъ хъ /q/ | Хъв хъв /qʷ/ | ХъӀ хъӀ /qˤ/ | ХъӀв хъӀв /qˤʷ/ | ХьӀ хьӀ /χˤ/ | ХьӀв хьӀв /χˤʷ/ | ХӀ хӀ /ʜ/ |
| Ц ц /t͡s/ | Цв цв /t͡sʷ/ | Цц цц /t͡sː/ | ЦцӀ ццӀ /t͡sʼː/ | ЦӀ цӀ /t͡sʼ/ | ЦӀв цӀв /t͡sʷʼ/ | Ч ч /t͡ʃ/ |
| Чв чв /t͡ʃʷ/ | ЧчӀ ччӀ /t͡ʃʼː/ | ЧӀ чӀ /t͡ʃʼ/ | ЧӀв чӀв /t͡ʃʷʼ/ | Ш ш /ʃ/ | Шв шв /ʃʷ/ | Щ щ /ʃː/ |
| Щв щв /ʃʷː/ | Ъ ъ /ʔ/ | | | | | |

== Grammar ==
=== Nouns ===
Archi nouns inflect for number (singular or plural) and for one of 10 regular cases and 5 locative cases that can all take one of 6 directional suffixes. There are four noun classes, which are only evident from verbal agreement.

==== Case ====
| Case | Marker | Sg. 'ram' | Pl. 'rams' |
|---|---|---|---|
| Absolutive | -∅ | baˤkʼ | baˤkʼ-ur |
| Ergative | -∅ | beˤkʼ-iri | baˤkʼ-ur-čaj |
| Genitive | -n | beˤkʼ-iri-n | baˤkʼ-ur-če-n |
| Dative | -s, -sː | beˤkʼ-iri-s | baˤkʼ-ur-če-s |
| Comitative | -𝼄ːu | beˤkʼ-iri-𝼄ːu | baˤkʼ-ur-če-𝼄ːu |
| Similative | -qˤdi | beˤkʼ-iri-qˤdi | baˤkʼ-ur-če-qˤdi |
| Causal | -šːi | beˤkʼ-iri-šːi | baˤkʼ-ur-če-šːi |
| Comparative | -χur | beˤkʼ-iri-χur | baˤkʼ-ur-če-χur |
| Partitive | -qˤiš | beˤkʼ-iri-qˤiš | baˤkʼ-ur-če-qˤiš |
| Substitutive | -k͡𝼄ʼəna | beˤkʼ-iri-k͡𝼄ʼəna | baˤkʼ-ur-če-k͡𝼄ʼəna |

Depending on the specifics of the analysis, the ergative and the absolutive cases are not always marked by a specific suffix. Rather, they are marked by the use of the basic (for the absolutive) and oblique (for the ergative) stems in the absence of other markers. There is also a locative-case series in which 6 directional-case suffixes are combined with 5 spatial cases to produce a total of 30 case-localization combinations. However, they do not constitute 30 distinct case forms because they are easily derivable from a pair of morphemes.

| Spatial case | Marker | Directional case | Marker |
|---|---|---|---|
| Inessive ("in") | -aj / -a | Essive ("As") | -∅ |
| Intrative ("between") | qˤ(a-) | Elative ("Out of") | -š |
| Superessive ("above") | -tːi- / -t | Lative ("To"/"Into") | -k |
| Subessive ("below") | -k͡𝼄ʼ(a-) | Allative ("Onto") | -ši |
| Pertingent ("against") | -ra- | Terminative (Specifies a limit) | -kena |
| | | Translative (Indicates change) | -χutː |

==== Noun classes ====
The four noun classes of Archi are only evident from verbal inflection. This table summarizes the noun classes and their associated verbal morphology:

| Class | Description | Singular | | Plural |
| Class | Description | Prefix | Infix | Prefix |
|---|---|---|---|---|
| I | Male human | w- | ⟨w⟩ | b- |
| II | Female human | d- | ⟨r⟩ | b- |
| III | All insects, some animates, some inanimates | b- | ⟨b⟩ | ∅- |
| IV | Abstracts, some animates, some inanimates | ∅ | ∅ | ∅- |

== Example phrases ==
The following phrases were phonetically transcribed from Archi:

| Archi transcription | English |
|---|---|
| x́it barḳur | The ladle breaks. |
| x́it ax̄u | The spoon (literally: little ladle) became dirty. |
| k̂ut̄ali berx̄ur | The bag stays. |
| k̂ut̄ali eku | The little bag fell. |
| č̣ut abḳu | The jug broke. |
| č̣ut aḳu | The little jug broke. |
| ḳunḳum barx̄ur | The kettle becomes dirty. |
| ḳunḳum oq̄́u | The little kettle sank (literally: drowned). |
| motol orq̄́ur | The young goat drowns. |
| uri arč̣ur | The young horse hides itself. |
| biš ač̣u | The young cow hid itself. |
| ḳêrt erkur | The young donkey falls. |
| dogi ebku | The donkey fell. |
| q̇on abč̣u | The goat hid itself. |
| nôiš ebx̄u | The horse stayed. |

=== Diminutive ===
The inclusions of "little" and "young" in the phrases translate a diminutive, which in Archi language commonly refers either to a smaller or younger version of the subject. The non-diminutive nouns in the above examples belong to noun class III, while their diminutives belong to noun class IV. This difference in noun class is reflected on the verb in all of these examples, by the contrast between class III agreement in b from class IV in ∅ (with no b). The -b- in the past tense appears in front of the -x̄u / -č̣u / -ku inflection, while in the present tense the b- is the first letter of the verb. For the nouns referring to inanimate objects, the class shift is the only sign of the diminutive: the noun itself does not change in form. E.g. x́it means both "ladle" (III) and "spoon" (IV), k̂ut̄ali both "bag" (III) and "little bag" (IV). Nouns pertaining to younger animals have different words, e.g. dogi "donkey" (III) but ḳêrt "young donkey" (IV), nôiš "horse" (III) but uri "young horse" (IV).

== Bibliography ==
- Bond, Oliver; Corbett, Greville G.; Chumakina, Marina; Brown, Dunstan, eds. (2016). Archi: Complexities of agreement in cross-theoretical perspective. Oxford: Oxford University Press.
- Chumakina, Marina; Dunstan Brown; Greville G. Corbett; Harely Quilliam (2007). A dictionary of Archi: Archi-Russian-English (Online ed.). University of Surrey. doi:10.15126/SMG.16/2.
- Kodzasov, Sandro (1977). "Fonetika Archinskogo Jazyka, part 2". In Kibrik, A. E.; Samedov, I. P.; Olovjannikova, D. S.; Kodzasov, S. V. (eds.). Opyt Strukturnogo Opisanija Archinskogo Jazyka. Vol. 1. Moscow: Izdatel’stvo Moskovskogo Universiteta.
- Ladefoged, Peter; Maddieson, Ian (1996). The Sounds of the World's Languages. Oxford: Blackwell. ISBN 0-631-19815-6.
