= Yevgeny Bokaryov =

Soviet linguist

Yevgeny Alekseyevich Bokaryov (Russian: Евгений Алексеевич Бокарёв, pronounced [jɪvˈɡʲenʲɪj bəkɐˈrʲɵf]; 25 February [O.S. 12 February] 1904 – 11 March 1971) was a Soviet linguist known among other things for his work on the Northeast Caucasian languages and his interlinguistics works; he was a member of the Academy of Esperanto.

Bokaryov was born in the village of Sredniy Yegorlyk, which was then part of the Stavropol Governorate in the Russian Empire (now in the Tselinsky District, Russia). After emigrating to Temir-Khan-Shura alongside his family during his primary years, he returned to Sredniy Yegorlyk following the February Revolution.

Bokarjov was the author of the Esperanto-Russian Dictionary and the Russian-Esperanto Dictionary (eo:Rusa-Esperanta Vortaro (E.A. Bokarev)).
