= Voiced palatal lateral approximant =

Consonantal sound represented by ⟨ʎ⟩ in IPA

ʎ
- IPA number: 157

Audio sample
- source · help

Encoding
- Entity (decimal): &#654;
- Unicode (hex): U+028E
- X-SAMPA: L
- Braille: ⠦ (braille pattern dots-236) ⠽ (braille pattern dots-13456)
Image

Voiced alveolo-palatal lateral approximant

l̠ʲ

ʎ̟

Audio sample
- source · help

A voiced palatal lateral approximant is a type of consonantal sound used in some spoken languages. The symbol in the International Phonetic Alphabet that represents this sound is ⟨ʎ⟩, a rotated lowercase letter ⟨y⟩.

Many languages that were previously thought to have a palatal lateral approximant actually have a lateral approximant that is, broadly, alveolo-palatal: the sound is articulated at a place in-between the alveolar ridge and the hard palate (excluded), and it may be variously described as alveolo-palatal, lamino-postalveolar, or postalveolo-prepalatal. None of the 13 languages investigated by Recasens (2013), many of them Romance, has a 'true' palatal. That is likely the case for several other languages listed here. Some languages, like Portuguese and Catalan, have a lateral approximant that varies between alveolar and alveolo-palatal.

What is transcribed ⟨ʎ⟩ is often actually a voiced alveolo-palatal lateral approximant. There is no dedicated symbol in the International Phonetic Alphabet that represents this sound, which is one reason that ⟨ʎ⟩ is used. If more precision is desired, it may be transcribed ⟨l̠ʲ⟩ or ⟨ʎ̟⟩. There is a non-IPA letter, U+0234 ȴ LATIN SMALL LETTER L WITH CURL; ⟨ȴ⟩ (⟨l⟩, plus the curl found in the symbols for alveolo-palatal sibilant fricatives ⟨ɕ, ʑ⟩), which is used especially in Sinological circles.

A voiced palatal lateral approximant contrasts phonemically with its voiceless counterpart /ʎ̥/ in the Xumi language spoken in China.

== Features ==
Features of a voiced palatal lateral approximant:

- Its manner of articulation is approximant, which means it is produced by narrowing the vocal tract at the place of articulation, but not enough to produce a turbulent airstream.
- Its place of articulation is palatal, which means it is articulated with the middle or back part of the tongue raised to the hard palate.
- Its phonation is voiced, which means the vocal cords vibrate during the articulation.
- It is an oral consonant, which means that air is not allowed to escape through the nose.
- It is a lateral consonant, which means it is produced by directing the airstream over the sides of the tongue, rather than down the middle.
- Its airstream mechanism is pulmonic, which means it is articulated by pushing air only with the intercostal muscles and abdominal muscles, as in most speech sounds.

== Occurrence ==
Language		Word	IPA	Meaning	Notes
Albanian	Malsia e Madhe	lule	[ˈʎuʎɛ]	'flower'	
Albanian	Arbëresh	lule	[ˈʎuʎɛ]	'flower'	
Albanian	Arvanitika	lule	[ˈʎuʎɛ]	'flower'	
Aragonese		agulla	[a̠ˈɣuʎa̠]	'needle'	
Aromanian		ljepuri	[ˈʎe̞puri]	'rabbit'	
Astur-Leonese	Asturian	llingua	[ˈʎĩŋɡwa̝]	'language'	Where /ʎ/ is absent and replaced by different sounds (depending on dialect), a phenomenon known as che vaqueira, its corresponding sounds are spelled ⟨ḷḷ⟩.
Astur-Leonese	Leonese	llingua	[ˈʎĩŋɡwa̝]	'language'	Where /ʎ/ is absent and replaced by different sounds (depending on dialect), a phenomenon known as che vaqueira, its corresponding sounds are spelled ⟨ḷḷ⟩.
Astur-Leonese	Mirandese	lhéngua	[ˈʎɛ̃ɡwɐ]	'language'	Where /ʎ/ is absent and replaced by different sounds (depending on dialect), a phenomenon known as che vaqueira, its corresponding sounds are spelled ⟨ḷḷ⟩.
Aymara		llaki	[ʎaki]	'sad'	
Basque		bonbilla	[bo̞mbiʎa̠]	'bulb'	
Breton		familh	[fa̠miʎ]	'family'	
Bulgarian		любов	[ʎuˈbof]	'love'	Alveolo-palatal. See Bulgarian phonology
Catalan	Most dialects	llac	[ˈʎäk]	'lake'	Alveolo-palatal. May merge with /j/ in some areas (ieisme). See Catalan phonology
Catalan	Eastern Aragon	clau	[ˈkʎäw]	'key'	Allophone of /l/ in consonant clusters.
Chipaya		lloqa	[ʎoqa]	'bank'	See Chipaya languages
English	Australian	million	[ˈmɪʎən]	'million'	Frequent realization of the sequence /lj/
English	Canadian (Atlantic and Newfoundland)	million	[ˈmɪʎən]	'million'	Frequent realization of the sequence /lj/
English	County Donegal	million	[ˈmɪʎən]	'million'	Realization of the sequence /lj/.
English	General American	million	[ˈmɪʎən]	'million'	Common realization of the sequence /lj/; sometimes realized as [jj]. See English phonology
English	Hiberno-English	million	[ˈmɪʎən]	'million'	Common realization of the sequence /lj/
English	New England	million	[ˈmɪʎən]	'million'	Common realization of the sequence /lj/
English	New York City	million	[ˈmɪʎən]	'million'	Common realization of the sequence /lj/
English	New Zealand	million	[ˈmɪʎən]	'million'	Common realization of the sequence /lj/
English	Received Pronunciation	million	[ˈmɪʎən]	'million'	Common realization of the sequence /lj/
English	South African	million	[ˈmɪʎən]	'million'	Common realization of the sequence /lj/
English	Southern American	million	[ˈmɪʎən]	'million'	Common realization of the sequence /lj/
English	Philippine	gorilla	[goˈɾɪʎɐ]	'gorilla'	Common realization of ⟨ll⟩ between vowels due to Spanish influence.
Enindhilyagwa		angalya	[aŋal̠ʲa]	'place'	Laminal post-alveolar
Faroese		telgja	[ˈtʰɛʎt͡ʃa]	'to carve'	Allophone of /l/ before palatal consonants. Voiceless [ʎ̥] before fortis consonnants. See Faroese phonology
Franco-Provençal		balyi	[baʎi]	'give'	
French	Some dialects	papillon	[papiʎɒ̃]	'butterfly'	Corresponds to /j/ in modern standard French. See French phonology
Galician	Standard	illado	[iˈʎa̠ðo̝]	'insulated'	Most Galician speakers, especially the urban and younger populations, are nowadays yeístas because of influence from Spanish
Greek		ήλιος	[ˈiʎos]	'sun'	Postalveolar. See Modern Greek phonology
Hungarian	Northern dialects	lyuk	[ʎuk]	'hole'	Alveolo-palatal. Modern Standard Hungarian has undergone a phenomenon akin to Spanish yeísmo, merging /ʎ/ into /j/. See Hungarian ly and Hungarian phonology
Irish		duille	[ˈd̪ˠɪl̠ʲə]	'leaf'	Alveolo-palatal. Some dialects contrast it with palatalized alveolar /lʲ/. See Irish phonology
Italian		figlio	[ˈfiʎːo]	'son'	Alveolo-palatal. Realized as fricative [ʎ̝] in a large number of accents. See Italian phonology
Ivilyuat		Ivil̃uɂat	[ʔivɪʎʊʔat]	'the speaking [Ivilyuat]' ('Ivilyuat language')	
Jaqaru		allaka	[a'ʎaka]	'pumpkin'	See Jaqaru Language
Jebero		llinllin	[ʎinʎin]	'name'	See Jebero Language
Korean	Seoul dialect	천리마 / cheollima	[t͡ɕʰʌ̹ʎʎima̠]	'qianlima'	/l/ is palatalized to [ʎ] before /i, j/ and before palatal consonant allophones
Latvian		ļaudis	[ʎàwdis]	'people'	See Latvian phonology
Mapudungun		aylla	[ˈɐjʎɜ]	'nine'	See Mapuche language
Norwegian	Northern and central dialects	alle	[ɑʎːe]	'all'	See Norwegian phonology
Occitan	Standard	miralhar	[miɾa̠ˈʎa̠]	'to reflect'	See Occitan phonology
Paiwan	Standard	veljevelj	[vəʎəvəʎ]	'banana'	See Paiwan language
Paez		silli	[siʎi]	'reed'	See Paezan languages
Portuguese	Standard	alho	[ˈaʎu]	'garlic'	Alveolo-palatal in European Portuguese. May instead be [lʲ], [l] (Northeast) or [j] (Caipira), especially before unrounded vowels. See Portuguese phonology
Portuguese	Many dialects	sandália	[sɐ̃ˈda̠l̠ʲɐ]	'sandal'	Possible realization of post-stressed /li/ plus vowel.
Quechua		qallu	[qaʎʊ]	'tongue'	
Romanian	Transylvanian dialects	lingură	[ˈʎinɡurə]	'spoon'	Corresponds to [l] in standard Romanian. See Romanian phonology
Romansh	Sursilvan	fegl	[feʎ]	'son'	
Romansh	Sutsilvan	fegl	[feʎ]	'son'	
Romansh	Surmiran	fegl	[feʎ]	'son'	
Romansh	Puter	figl	[fiʎ]	'son'	
Romansh	Vallader	figl	[fiʎ]	'son'	
Romansh	Rumantsch Grischun	figl	[fiʎ]	'son'	
Scottish Gaelic		till	[tʲʰiːʎ]	'return'	Palatal or palatalised apical dental. Can manifest as [j], or among some younger speakers, as [lj]. See Scottish Gaelic phonology
Serbo-Croatian		љуљaшка / ljuljačka	[ʎ̟ǔʎ̟äːʂkä], [ʎ̟ǔʎ̟äːt͡ʂkä]	'swing (seat)'	Palato-alveolar. See Serbo-Croatian phonology
Sissano		piyl	[piʎ]	'fish'	
Slovak		ľúbiť	[ˈʎu̞ːbi̞c]	'to love'	Merges with /l/ in western dialects. See Slovak phonology
Spanish	Andean (from Argentina to Colombia)	caballo	[ka̠ˈβ̞a̠.ʎo̞]	'horse'	Found in traditional speakers in Peninsular Spanish. Also found in Andean countries and Paraguay. For most speakers, this sound has merged with /ʝ/, a phenomenon called yeísmo. See Spanish phonology. "Caballo" with yeísmo is pronounced [ka̠ˈβ̞a̠.ʝo̞]
Spanish	Castilian, Aragonese and Catalonian outside of large cities	caballo	[ka̠ˈβ̞a̠.ʎo̞]	'horse'	Found in traditional speakers in Peninsular Spanish. Also found in Andean countries and Paraguay. For most speakers, this sound has merged with /ʝ/, a phenomenon called yeísmo. See Spanish phonology. "Caballo" with yeísmo is pronounced [ka̠ˈβ̞a̠.ʝo̞]
Spanish	Central areas in Extremadura	caballo	[ka̠ˈβ̞a̠.ʎo̞]	'horse'	Found in traditional speakers in Peninsular Spanish. Also found in Andean countries and Paraguay. For most speakers, this sound has merged with /ʝ/, a phenomenon called yeísmo. See Spanish phonology. "Caballo" with yeísmo is pronounced [ka̠ˈβ̞a̠.ʝo̞]
Spanish	Eastern and southwestern Manchego	caballo	[ka̠ˈβ̞a̠.ʎo̞]	'horse'	Found in traditional speakers in Peninsular Spanish. Also found in Andean countries and Paraguay. For most speakers, this sound has merged with /ʝ/, a phenomenon called yeísmo. See Spanish phonology. "Caballo" with yeísmo is pronounced [ka̠ˈβ̞a̠.ʝo̞]
Spanish	Paraguayan	caballo	[ka̠ˈβ̞a̠.ʎo̞]	'horse'	Found in traditional speakers in Peninsular Spanish. Also found in Andean countries and Paraguay. For most speakers, this sound has merged with /ʝ/, a phenomenon called yeísmo. See Spanish phonology. "Caballo" with yeísmo is pronounced [ka̠ˈβ̞a̠.ʝo̞]
Spanish	Philippine	caballo	[ka̠ˈβ̞a̠.ʎo̞]	'horse'	Found in traditional speakers in Peninsular Spanish. Also found in Andean countries and Paraguay. For most speakers, this sound has merged with /ʝ/, a phenomenon called yeísmo. See Spanish phonology. "Caballo" with yeísmo is pronounced [ka̠ˈβ̞a̠.ʝo̞]
Spanish	Very few areas in Andalusia	caballo	[ka̠ˈβ̞a̠.ʎo̞]	'horse'	Found in traditional speakers in Peninsular Spanish. Also found in Andean countries and Paraguay. For most speakers, this sound has merged with /ʝ/, a phenomenon called yeísmo. See Spanish phonology. "Caballo" with yeísmo is pronounced [ka̠ˈβ̞a̠.ʝo̞]
Spanish	Murcian	cayó	[ka̠ˈʎo̞]	'fall'	Ultralleísmo, rural
Xumi	Lower	[ʎ̟o˩˥]		'musk deer'	Alveolo-palatal; contrasts with the voiceless /ʎ̥/.
Xumi	Upper	[ʎ̟ɛ˦]		'correct, right'	Alveolo-palatal; contrasts with the voiceless /ʎ̥/.

== See also ==
- Yeísmo, a feature of Spanish dialects that have merged this sound with a voiced palatal fricative.
- Index of phonetics articles

== Notes ==
Place →	Labial					Coronal										Dorsal					Laryngeal			
Manner ↓	Bilabial		Labiodental		Linguolabial		Dental		Alveolar		Postalveolar		Retroflex		(Alveolo-)palatal		Velar		Uvular		Pharyngeal/epiglottal		Glottal	
Nasal	m̥	m	ɱ̊	ɱ		n̼	n̪̊	n̪	n̥	n	n̠̊	n̠	ɳ̊	ɳ	ɲ̊	ɲ	ŋ̊	ŋ	ɴ̥	ɴ				
Plosive	p	b	p̪	b̪	t̼	d̼	t̪	d̪	t	d			ʈ	ɖ	c	ɟ	k	ɡ	q	ɢ	ʡ		ʔ	
Sibilant affricate							t̪s̪	d̪z̪	ts	dz	t̠ʃ	d̠ʒ	tʂ	dʐ	tɕ	dʑ								
Non-sibilant affricate	pɸ	bβ	p̪f	b̪v			t̪θ	d̪ð	tɹ̝̊	dɹ̝	t̠ɹ̠̊˔	d̠ɹ̠˔			cç	ɟʝ	kx	ɡɣ	qχ	ɢʁ	ʡʜ	ʡʢ	ʔh	
Sibilant fricative							s̪	z̪	s	z	ʃ	ʒ	ʂ	ʐ	ɕ	ʑ								
Non-sibilant fricative	ɸ	β	f	v	θ̼	ð̼	θ	ð	θ̠	ð̠	ɹ̠̊˔	ɹ̠˔	ɻ̊˔	ɻ˔	ç	ʝ	x	ɣ	χ	ʁ	ħ	ʕ	h	ɦ
Approximant		β̞		ʋ				ð̞		ɹ		ɹ̠		ɻ		j		ɰ						˷
Tap/flap		ⱱ̟		ⱱ					ɾ̥	ɾ			ɽ̊	ɽ						ɢ̆		ʡ̆		
Trill	ʙ̥	ʙ							r̥	r		r̠	ɽ̊r̥	ɽr					ʀ̥	ʀ	ʜ	ʢ		
Lateral affricate									tɬ	dɮ			tꞎ	d𝼅	c𝼆	ɟʎ̝	k𝼄	ɡʟ̝						
Lateral fricative							ɬ̪		ɬ	ɮ			ꞎ	𝼅	𝼆	ʎ̝	𝼄	ʟ̝						
Lateral approximant								l̪	l̥	l		l̠	ɭ̊	ɭ	ʎ̥	ʎ	ʟ̥	ʟ		ʟ̠				
Lateral tap/flap									ɺ̥	ɺ			𝼈̊	𝼈		ʎ̆		ʟ̆						

		BL	LD	D	A	PA	RF	P	V	U
Implosive	Voiced	ɓ			ɗ		ᶑ	ʄ	ɠ	ʛ
Implosive	Voiceless	ɓ̥			ɗ̥		ᶑ̊	ʄ̊	ɠ̊	ʛ̥
Ejective	Stop	pʼ			tʼ		ʈʼ	cʼ	kʼ	qʼ
Ejective	Affricate		p̪fʼ	tθʼ	tsʼ	tʃʼ	tʂʼ	tɕʼ	kxʼ	qχʼ
Ejective	Fricative	ɸʼ	fʼ	θʼ	sʼ	ʃʼ	ʂʼ	ɕʼ	xʼ	χʼ
Ejective	Lateral affricate				tɬʼ			c𝼆ʼ	k𝼄ʼ	q𝼄ʼ
Ejective	Lateral fricative				ɬʼ					
Click (top: velar; bottom: uvular)	Tenuis	kʘ qʘ		kǀ qǀ	kǃ qǃ		k𝼊 q𝼊	kǂ qǂ		
Click (top: velar; bottom: uvular)	Voiced	ɡʘ ɢʘ		ɡǀ ɢǀ	ɡǃ ɢǃ		ɡ𝼊 ɢ𝼊	ɡǂ ɢǂ		
Click (top: velar; bottom: uvular)	Nasal	ŋʘ ɴʘ		ŋǀ ɴǀ	ŋǃ ɴǃ		ŋ𝼊 ɴ𝼊	ŋǂ ɴǂ	ʞ	
Click (top: velar; bottom: uvular)	Tenuis lateral				kǁ qǁ					
Click (top: velar; bottom: uvular)	Voiced lateral				ɡǁ ɢǁ					
Click (top: velar; bottom: uvular)	Nasal lateral				ŋǁ ɴǁ					
