= List of endangered languages in Russia =

Language Endangerment Status by UNESCO Atlas of the World's Languages in Danger category

Extinct (EX)
- Extinct (EX): (lists)

Endangered
- Critically Endangered (CR); Severely Endangered (SE); Definitely Endangered (DE); Vulnerable (VU): (list); (list); (list); (list)

Safe
- Safe (NE): no list
- Other categories
- Revived (RE); Constructed (CL): (list); (list)
- Related topics: Atlas of the World's Languages in Danger; Endangered Languages Project; Ethnologue; Unclassified language; List of languages by total number of speakers
- UNESCO Atlas of the World's; Languages in Danger categories

An endangered language is a language that is at risk of falling out of use, generally because it has few surviving speakers. If it loses all of its native speakers, it becomes an extinct language. A language may be endangered in one area but show signs of revitalisation in another, as with the Irish language.

The United Nations Educational, Scientific and Cultural Organization defines five levels of language endangerment between "safe" (not endangered) and "extinct":

- Vulnerable – "most children speak the language, but it may be restricted to certain domains (e.g. home)"
- Definitely endangered – "children no longer learn the language as mother tongue in the home"
- Severely endangered – "language is spoken by grandparents and older generations; while the parent generation may understand it, they do not speak it to children or among themselves"
- Critically endangered – "the youngest speakers are grandparents and older, and they speak the language partially and infrequently"
- Extinct – "there are no speakers left; included in the Atlas if presumably extinct since the 1950s"

The list below includes the findings from the third edition of Atlas of the World's Languages in Danger (2010; formerly the Red Book of Endangered Languages), as well as the online edition of the aforementioned publication, both published by UNESCO.

Russian Federation
Language	Status	Language Family	Nations	ISO 639-3
Abaza language	Definitely endangered	Northwest Caucasian	Russia, Turkey	abq
Abkhaz language	Vulnerable	Northwest Caucasian	Georgia, Russia, Turkey	abk
Adyghe language (West Circassian)	Definitely endangered	Northwest Caucasian	Iraq, Israel, Jordan, Macedonia, Russia, Syria, Turkey	ady
Agul language	Definitely endangered	Northeast Caucasian (Lezgic)	Azerbaijan, Russia	agx
Akhvakh language	Definitely endangered	Northeast Caucasian (Andic)	Azerbaijan, Russia	akv
Aleut language (Western, Commander Islands)	Critically endangered	Eskaleut (Aleut)	Russia, United States	ale
Alutor language	Severely endangered	Chukotko-Kamchatkan	Russia	alu
Andi language	Definitely endangered	Northeast Caucasian (Andic)	Russia	ani
Archi language	Definitely endangered	Northeast Caucasian (Lezgic)	Russia	aqc
Avar language	Vulnerable	Northeast Caucasian (Avar)	Azerbaijan, Russia	ava
Bagvalal language	Definitely endangered	Northeast Caucasian (Andic)	Russia	kva
Baraba Tatar dialect	Severely endangered	Turkic (Kipchak)	Russia	
Bashkir language	Vulnerable	Turkic (Kipchak)	Russia	bak
Belarusian language	Vulnerable	Indo-European (East Slavic)	Belarus, Latvia, Lithuania, Poland, Russia, Ukraine	bel
Bezhta language	Definitely endangered	Northeast Caucasian (Tsezic)	Russia	kap
Bohtan Neo-Aramaic dialect	Severely endangered	Afro-Asiatic (Semitic)	Georgia, Russia	bhn
Botlikh language	Definitely endangered	Northeast Caucasian (Andic)	Russia	bph
Buryat language	Severely endangered	Mongolic	China, Mongolia, Russia	bua
Central Selkup language	Critically endangered	Uralic (Samoyedic)	Russia	
Central Siberian Yupik language	Severely endangered	Eskaleut	Russia, United States	ess
Chamalal language	Definitely endangered	Northeast Caucasian (Andic)	Russia	cji
Chechen language	Vulnerable	Northeast Caucasian	Russia	che
Chelkan language	Severely endangered	Turkic (Siberian Turkic)	Russia	
Chukchi language	Severely endangered	Chukotko-Kamchatkan	Russia	ckt
Chulym language	Critically endangered	Turkic (Siberian Turkic)	Russia	clw
Chuvash language	Vulnerable	Turkic	Russia	chv
Dargwa language	Vulnerable	Northeast Caucasian (Dargin)	Russia	dar
Dolgan language	Definitely endangered	Turkic (Siberian Turkic)	Russia	dlg
Eastern Khanty language	Definitely endangered	Uralic	Russia	
Eastern Mansi language	Critically endangered	Uralic	Russia	
Eastern Mari language	Definitely endangered	Uralic (Mari)	Russia	mhr
Erzya language	Definitely endangered	Uralic (Mordvinic)	Russia	myv
Even language	Severely endangered	Tungusic (Northern)	Russia	eve
Evenki language	Severely endangered	Tungusic (Northern)	China, Russia	evn
Forest Enets language	Critically endangered	Uralic (Samoyedic)	Russia	enf
Forest Nenets language	Severely endangered	Uralic (Samoyedic)	Russia	
Forest Yukagir language	Critically endangered	Yukaghir	Russia	yux
Godoberi language	Definitely endangered	Northeast Caucasian (Andic)	Russia	gdo
Hinukh language	Definitely endangered	Northeast Caucasian (Tsezic)	Russia	gin
Homshetsi dialect	Severely endangered	Indo-European (Armenian)	Armenia, Georgia, Russia, Turkey	
Hunzib language	Definitely endangered	Northeast Caucasian (Tsezic)	Georgia, Russia	huz
Ingrian language	Severely endangered	Uralic (Finnic)	Russia	izh
Ingush language	Vulnerable	Northeast Caucasian (Nakh)	Russia	inh
Itelmen language	Critically endangered	Chukotko-Kamchatkan	Russia	itl
Judeo-Tat	Definitely endangered	Indo-European (Indo-Iranian)	Azerbaijan, Israel, Russia	jdt
Kabardian	Vulnerable	Northwest Caucasian (Circassian)	Jordan, Russia, Syria, Turkey	kbd
Kalmyk language	Definitely endangered	Mongolic	Russia	xal
Karachay-Balkar language	Vulnerable	Turkic (Kipchak)	Russia	krc
Karata language	Definitely endangered	Northeast Caucasian (Andic)	Russia	kpt
Karelian language	Definitely endangered	Uralic (Finnic)	Finland, Russia	krl
Ket language	Severely endangered	Yeniseian	Russia	ket
Khakas language	Definitely endangered	Turkic (Siberian Turkic)	Russia	kjh
Khamnigan Mongol language	Definitely endangered	Mongolic	China, Mongolia, Russia	ykh
Khwarshi language	Definitely endangered	Northeast Caucasian (Tsezic)	Russia	khv
Kildin Saami language	Severely endangered	Uralic (Sámi)	Russia	sjd
Kili language	Severely endangered	Tungusic (Northern?)	Russia	
Komi language	Definitely endangered	Uralic (Permic)	Russia	kpv
Koryak language	Severely endangered	Chukotko-Kamchatkan	Russia	kpy
Kumandin language	Critically endangered	Turkic (Siberian Turkic)	Russia	
Kumyk language	Vulnerable	Turkic (Kipchak)	Russia	kum
Lak language	Vulnerable	Northeast Caucasian	Russia	lbe
Latgalian language	Vulnerable	Indo-European (Baltic)	Latvia, Russia	ltg
Lezgian language	Vulnerable	Northeast Caucasian (Lezgic)	Azerbaijan, Russia	lez
Ludic language	Severely endangered	Uralic (Finnic)	Russia	lud
Moksha language	Definitely endangered	Uralic (Mordvinic)	Russia	mdf
Nanai language	Severely endangered	Tungusic (Southern)	China, Russia	gld
Naukan Yupik language	Critically endangered	Eskaleut	Russia	ynk
Negidal language	Critically endangered	Tungusic (Northern)	Russia	neg
Nganasan language	Severely endangered	Uralic (Samoyedic)	Russia	nio
Nivkh language	Severely endangered	Isolate	Russia	niv
Nogai language	Definitely endangered	Turkic (Kipchak)	Bulgaria, Kazakhstan, Romania, Russia, Turkey, Ukraine, Uzbekistan	nog
Northern Sámi	Definitely endangered	Uralic (Sámi)	Finland, Norway, Russia, Sweden	sme
Northern Altai language	Severely endangered	Turkic (Siberian Turkic)	Russia	atv
Northern Khanty language	Definitely endangered	Uralic	Russia	
Northern Mansi language	Severely endangered	Uralic	Russia	
Northern Selkup language	Severely endangered	Uralic (Samoyedic)	Russia	
Olonetsian language	Definitely endangered	Uralic (Finnic)	Finland, Russia	olo
Oroch language	Critically endangered	Tungusic (Northern)	Russia	oac
Orok language	Critically endangered	Tungusic (Southern)	Japan, Russia	oaa
Ossetian language	Vulnerable	Indo-European (Indo-Iranian)	Georgia, Russia	oss
Pontic Greek language	Definitely endangered	Indo-European (Hellenic)	Armenia, Georgia, Greece, Kazakhstan, Russia, Turkey, Ukraine	pnt
Romani language	Definitely endangered	Indo-European (Indo-Aryan)	Albania, Austria, Belarus, Bosnia and Herzegovina, Bulgaria, Croatia, Czech Republic, Estonia, Finland, France, Germany, Greece, Hungary, Italy, Latvia, Lithuania, Macedonia, Montenegro, Netherlands, Poland, Romania, Russia, Serbia, Slovakia, Slovenia, Switzerland, Turkey, Ukraine, United Kingdom	rom
Rutul language	Definitely endangered	Northeast Caucasian (Lezgic)	Azerbaijan, Russia	rut
Seto dialect	Definitely endangered	Uralic (Finnic)	Estonia, Russia	
Shor language	Severely endangered	Turkic (Siberian Turkic)	Russia	cjs
Siberian Tatar language	Definitely endangered	Turkic (Kipchak)	Russia	sty
Skolt Sámi language	Severely endangered	Uralic (Sámi)	Finland, Russia	sms
Southern Altai language	Definitely endangered	Turkic (Kipchak)	Russia	alt
Southern Selkup language	Critically endangered	Uralic (Samoyedic)	Russia	
Soyot language	Extinct, partly revitalized	Turkic (Siberian Turkic)	Mongolia, Russia	
Tabasaran language	Vulnerable	Northeast Caucasian (Lezgic)	Russia	tab
Taz dialect	Severely endangered	Sino-Tibetan (Sinitic)	Russia	
Teleut language	Critically endangered	Turkic (Kipchak)	Russia	
Ter Sámi language	Critically endangered	Uralic (Sámi)	Russia	sjt
Tindi language	Definitely endangered	Northeast Caucasian (Andic)	Russia	tin
Tofa language	Critically endangered	Turkic (Siberian Turkic)	Russia	kim
Türkpen	Definitely endangered	Turkic (Oghuz)	Russia	
Tsakhur language	Definitely endangered	Northeast Caucasian (Lezgic)	Azerbaijan, Russia	tkr
Tsez language	Definitely endangered	Northeast Caucasian (Tsezic)	Russia	ddo
Tundra Enets language	Critically endangered	Uralic (Samoyedic)	Russia	enh
Tundra Nenets language	Definitely endangered	Uralic (Samoyedic)	Russia	
Tundra Yukagir language	Critically endangered	Yukaghir	Russia	ykg
Tuvan language	Vulnerable	Turkic	China, Mongolia, Russia	tyv
Udege language	Critically endangered	Tungusic (Northern)	Russia	ude
Udmurt language	Definitely endangered	Uralic (Permic)	Russia	udm
Ulch language	Critically endangered	Tungusic	Russia	ulc
Veps language	Severely endangered	Uralic (Finnic)	Russia	vep
Votic language	Critically endangered	Uralic (Finnic)	Russia	vot
Western Mari language	Severely endangered	Uralic	Russia	mrj
Yakut language	Vulnerable	Turkic (Siberian Turkic)	Russia	sah
Yiddish language (Europe)	Definitely endangered	Indo-European (Germanic)	Austria, Belarus, Belgium, Czech Republic, Denmark, Estonia, Finland, France, Germany, Hungary, Italy, Latvia, Lithuania, Luxembourg, Moldova, Norway, Netherlands, Poland, Romania, Russia, Slovakia, Sweden, Switzerland, Ukraine, United Kingdom	ydd

== See also ==
- List of endangered languages in Europe
- List of endangered languages in Asia
- List of endangered languages in Africa
