= 2010 Russian census =

11th Russian census

- 14–25 October 2010
- Logo

General information
- Country: Russia
- Authority: Rosstat

Results
- Total population: 142,905,200

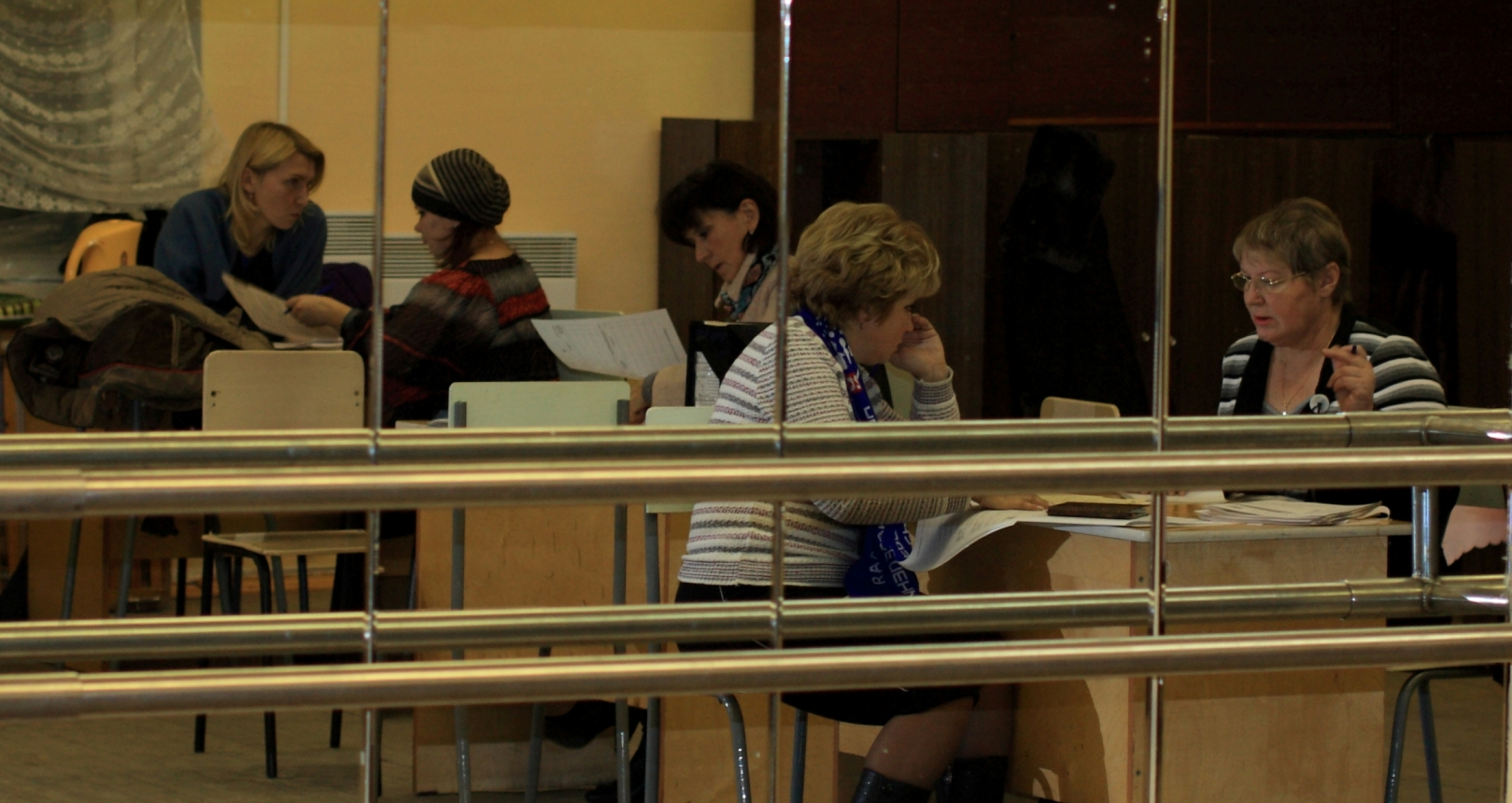
Inside a census station in Severodvinsk

The 2010 Russian census (Russian: Всеросси́йская пе́репись населе́ния 2010 го́да) was the second census of the Russian Federation population after the dissolution of the Soviet Union. Preparations for the census began in 2007 and it took place between October 14 and October 25.

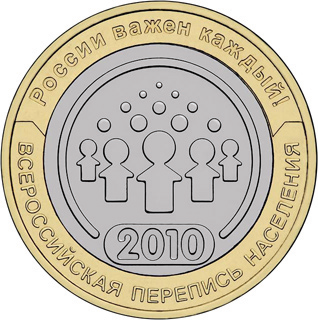
A 10-ruble coin commemorating the 2010 Census

== The census ==
The census was originally scheduled for October 2010, before being rescheduled for late 2013, citing financial reasons, although it was also speculated that political motives were influential in the decision. However, in late 2009, Prime Minister Putin announced that the Government of Russia had allocated 10.5 billion rubles in order to conduct the census as originally scheduled (in October 2010).

== Results ==
Population-sex pyramid according to the 2010 census

The census recorded the population as 142.9 million, a decrease of 2.3 million (1.6%) since the 2002 census. The population is 73.7% urban (105.3 million) and 26.3% rural (37.5 million). The median age is 38 years. The ethnic composition is dominated by Russians (80.9% of the population).

Population of the Russian Federation by ethnic group According to the 2010 census
#	Group name in English	Group name in Russian	Population	% of RF population
1	Abazins	Абазины	43,341	0.0303%
2	Abkhazians	Абхазы	11,249	0.0079%
3	Avars	Аварцы	912,090	0.6383%
4	Andis	Андийцы	11,789	0.0082%
5	Archi	Арчинцы	12	0%
6	Akhvakhs	Ахвахцы	7,930	0.0055%
7	Bagvalal	Багулалы	5	0%
8	Bezhta	Бежтинцы	5,958	0.0042%
9	Botlikh	Ботлихцы	3,508	0.0025%
10	Hinukh	Гинухцы	443	0.0003%
11	Godoberi	Годоберинцы	427	0.0003%
12	Hunzib	Гунзибцы	918	0.0006%
13	Dido	Дидойцы	11,683	0.0082%
14	Karata	Каратинцы	4,787	0.0033%
15	Tindi	Тиндалы	635	0.0004%
16	Khwarshi	Хваршины	527	0.0004%
17	Chamalal	Чамалалы	24	0%
18	Aghuls	Агулы	34,160	0.0239%
19	Adygheans	Адыгейцы	124,835	0.0874%
20	Azerbaijanis	Азербайджанцы	603,070	0.422%
21	Aleuts	Алеуты	482	0.0003%
22	Altaians	Алтайцы	74,238	0.052%
23	Telengits	Теленгиты	3,712	0.0026%
24	Tubalar	Тубалары	1,965	0.0014%
25	Chelkans	Челканцы	1,181	0.0008%
26	Americans	Американцы	1,572	0.0011%
27	Arabs	Арабы	39,583	0.0277%
28	Armenians	Армяне	1,182,388	0.8274%
29	Cherkesogai	Черкесогаи	6	0%
30	Assyrians	Ассирийцы	11,084	0.0078%
31	Afghans	Афганцы	5,350	0.0037%
32	Balkars	Балкарцы	112,924	0.079%
33	Bashkirs	Башкиры	1,584,554	1.1089%
34	Belarusians	Белорусы	521,443	0.3649%
35	Besermyan	Бесермяне	2,201	0.0015%
36	Bulgarians	Болгары	24,038	0.0168%
37	Bosniaks	Боснийцы	256	0.0002%
38	Britons	Британцы	950	0.0007%
39	Buryats	Буряты	461,389	0.3229%
40	Hungarians	Венгры	2,781	0.0019%
41	Vepsians	Вепсы	5,936	0.0042%
42	Votes	Водь	64	0%
43	Vietnamese	Вьетнамцы	13,954	0.0098%
44	Gagauzes	Гагаузы	13,690	0.0096%
45	Caucasus Jews	Горские евреи	762	0.0005%
46	Greeks	Греки	85,640	0.0599%
47	Urums	Греки-урумы	1	0%
48	Georgian Jews	Грузинские евреи	78	0.0001%
49	Georgians	Грузины	157,803	0.1104%
50	Adjarians	Аджарцы	211	0.0001%
51	Ingiloys	Ингилойцы	98	0.0001%
52	Lazi	Лазы	160	0.0001%
53	Mingrelians	Мегрелы	600	0.0004%
54	Svans	Сваны	45	0%
55	Dargins	Даргинцы	589,386	0.4124%
56	Kaitags	Кайтагцы	7	0%
57	Kubachis	Кубачинцы	120	0.0001%
58	Dolgans	Долганы	7,885	0.0055%
59	Dungans	Дунгане	1,651	0.0012%
60	Jews	Евреи	156,801	0.1097%
61	Yazidis	Езиды	40,586	0.0284%
62	Izhorians	Ижорцы	266	0.0002%
63	Ingush	Ингуши	444,833	0.3113%
64	Indians	Индийцы	4,058	0.0028%
65	Spaniards	Испанцы	1,162	0.0008%
66	Italians	Итальянцы	4,370	0.0031%
67	Itelmens	Ительмены	3,193	0.0022%
68	Kabardians	Кабардинцы	516,826	0.3617%
69	Kazakhs	Казахи	647,732	0.4533%
70	Kalmyks	Калмыки	183,372	0.1283%
71	Kamchadals	Камчадалы	1,927	0.0013%
72	Crimean Karaites	Караимы	205	0.0001%
73	Karakalpaks	Каракалпаки	1,466	0.001%
74	Karachays	Карачаевцы	218,403	0.1528%
75	Karelians	Карелы	60,815	0.0426%
76	Kereks	Кереки	64	0%
77	Kets	Кеты	1,219	0.0009%
78	Yughs	Юги	1	0%
79	Kyrgyz	Киргизы	103,422	0.0724%
80	Chinese	Китайцы	28,943	0.0203%
81	Komi	Коми	228,235	0.0203%
82	Komi-Zyrians	Коми-ижемцы	6,420	0.0045%
83	Komi-Permyaks	Коми-пермяки	94,456	0.0661%
84	Koreans	Корейцы	153,156	0.1072%
85	Koryaks	Коряки	7,953	0.0056%
86	Crimean Tatars	Крымские татары	2,449	0.0017%
87	Krymchaks	Крымчаки	90	0.0001%
88	Cubans	Кубинцы	676	0.0005%
89	Kumandins	Кумандинцы	2,892	0.002%
90	Kumyks	Кумыки	503,060	0.352%
91	Kurds	Курды	23,232	0.0163%
92	Kurmanjis	Курманч	42	0%
93	Laks	Лакцы	178,630	0.125%
94	Latvians	Латыши	18,979	0.0133%
95	Latgalians	Латгальцы	1,089	0.0008%
96	Lezgins	Лезгины	473,722	0.3315%
97	Lithuanians	Литовцы	31,377	0.022%
98	Macedonians	Македонцы	325	0.0002%
99	Mansij	Манси	12,269	0.0086%
100	Mari	Марийцы	547,605	0.3832%
101	Hill Mari	Горные марийцы	23,559	0.0165%
102	Meadow Mari	Лугово-восточные марийцы	218	0.0002%
103	Moldovans	Молдаване	156,400	0.1094%
104	Mongols	Монголы	2,986	0.0021%
105	Mordvins	Мордва	744,237	0.5208%
106	Mokshas	Мокшане	4,767	0.0033%
107	Erzyas	Эрзяне	57,008	0.0399%
108	Nagaybaks	Нагайбаки	8,148	0.0057%
109	Nanai	Нанайцы	12,003	0.0084%
110	Nganasans	Нганасаны	862	0.0006%
111	Negidals	Негидальцы	513	0.0004%
112	Germans	Немцы	394,138	0.2758%
113	Norwegians	Норвежцы	20,498	0.0143%
114	Mennonites	Меннониты	4	0%
115	Nenets	Ненцы	44,640	0.0312%
116	Nivkh	Нивхи	4,652	0.0033%
117	Nogais	Ногайцы	103,660	0.0725%
118	Karagash	Карагаши	16	0%
119	Orochs	Орочи	596	0.0004%
120	Ossetians	Осетины	528,515	0.3698%
121	Digors	Дигорцы	223	0.0002%
122	Irons	Иронцы	48	0%
123	Pakistanis	Пакистанцы	4,507	0.0032%
124	Pamiris	Памирцы	363	0.0003%
125	Persians	Персы	3,696	0.0026%
126	Poles	Поляки	47,125	0.033%
127	Romanians	Румыны	26,201	0.0183%
128	Rusyns	Русины	225	0.0002%
129	Russians	Русские	111,016,896	77.6885%
130	Cossacks	Казаки	67,573	0.0473%
131	Pomors	Поморы	3,113	0.0022%
132	Rutuls	Рутульцы	35,240	0.0247%
133	Sami	Саамы	1,771	0.0012%
134	Selkups	Селькупы	3,649	0.0026%
135	Serbs	Сербы	3,510	0.0025%
136	Slovaks	Словаки	1,324	0.0009%
137	Slovenes	Словенцы	908	0.0006%
138	Soyots	Сойоты	3,608	0.0025%
139	Bukharan Jews	Среднеазиатские евреи	32	0%
140	Tabasarans	Табасараны	146,360	0.1024%
141	Tajiks	Таджики	200,303	0.1402%
142	Taz	Тазы	274	0.0002%
143	Talysh	Талыши	2,529	0.0018%
144	Tatars	Татары	5,310,649	3.7163%
145	Astrakhan Tatars	Астраханские татары	7	0%
146	Kryashens	Кряшены	34,822	0.0244%
147	Mishar Tatars	Мишари	786	0.0006%
148	Siberian Tatars	Сибирские татары	6,779	0.0047%
149	Tats	Таты	1,585	0.0011%
150	Teleuts	Телеуты	2,643	0.0018%
151	Tofalars	Тофалары	762	0.0005%
152	Tuvans	Тувинцы	263,934	0.1847%
153	Tozhu Tuvans	Тувинцы-тоджинцы	1,858	0.0013%
154	Turks	Турки	105,058	0.0735%
155	Meskhetian Turks	Турки-месхетинцы	4,825	0.0034%
156	Turkmens	Туркмены	36,885	0.0258%
157	Udis	Удины	4,267	0.003%
158	Udmurts	Удмурты	552,299	0.3865%
159	Udege	Удэгейцы	1,496	0.001%
160	Uzbeks	Узбеки	289,862	0.2028%
161	Uyghurs	Уйгуры	3,696	0.0026%
162	Oroks	Ороки	295	0.0002%
163	Ukrainians	Украинцы	1,927,988	1.3492%
164	Ulch	Ульчи	2,765	0.0019%
165	Finns	Финны	20,267	0.0142%
166	Ingrian Finns	Ингерманландцы	17,300	0.0121%
167	French	Французы	1,475	0.001%
168	Khakas	Хакасы	72,959	0.0511%
169	Khanty	Ханты	30,943	0.0217%
170	Hemshin	Хемшилы	2,047	0.0014%
171	Croats	Хорваты	1,304	0.0009%
172	Tsakhurs	Цахуры	12,769	0.0089%
173	Romani	Цыгане	204,958	0.1434%
174	Central Asian Romani	Среднеазиатские цыгане	49	0%
175	Circassians	Черкесы	73,184	0.0512%
176	Montenegrins	Черногорцы	181	0.0001%
177	Czechs	Чехи	1,898	0.0013%
178	Chechens	Чеченцы	1,431,360	1.0017%
179	Aukhs	Равнинные аккинцы	76	0.0001%
180	Chuvans	Чуванцы	1,002	0.0007%
181	Chuvash	Чуваши	1,435,872	1.0048%
182	Chukchi	Чукчи	15,908	0.0111%
183	Chulyms	Чулымцы	355	0.0002%
184	Shapsugs	Шапсуги	3,882	0.0027%
185	Swedes	Шведы	4,100	0.0029%
186	Shors	Шорцы	12,888	0.009%
187	Evenks	Эвенки	37,843	0.0265%
188	Evens	Эвены (ламуты)	22,383	0.0157%
189	Enets	Энцы	227	0.0002%
190	Yupik	Эскимосы	1,738	0.0012%
191	Estonians	Эстонцы	17,875	0.0125%
192	Setos	Сету	214	0.0001%
193	Yukaghirs	Юкагиры	1,603	0.0011%
194	Yakuts	Якуты	478,085	0.3346%
195	Japanese	Японцы	5,888	0.0041%

== See also ==
- Demographics of Russia
