= Hinukh people =

Northeast Caucasian ethnic group

Hinukh
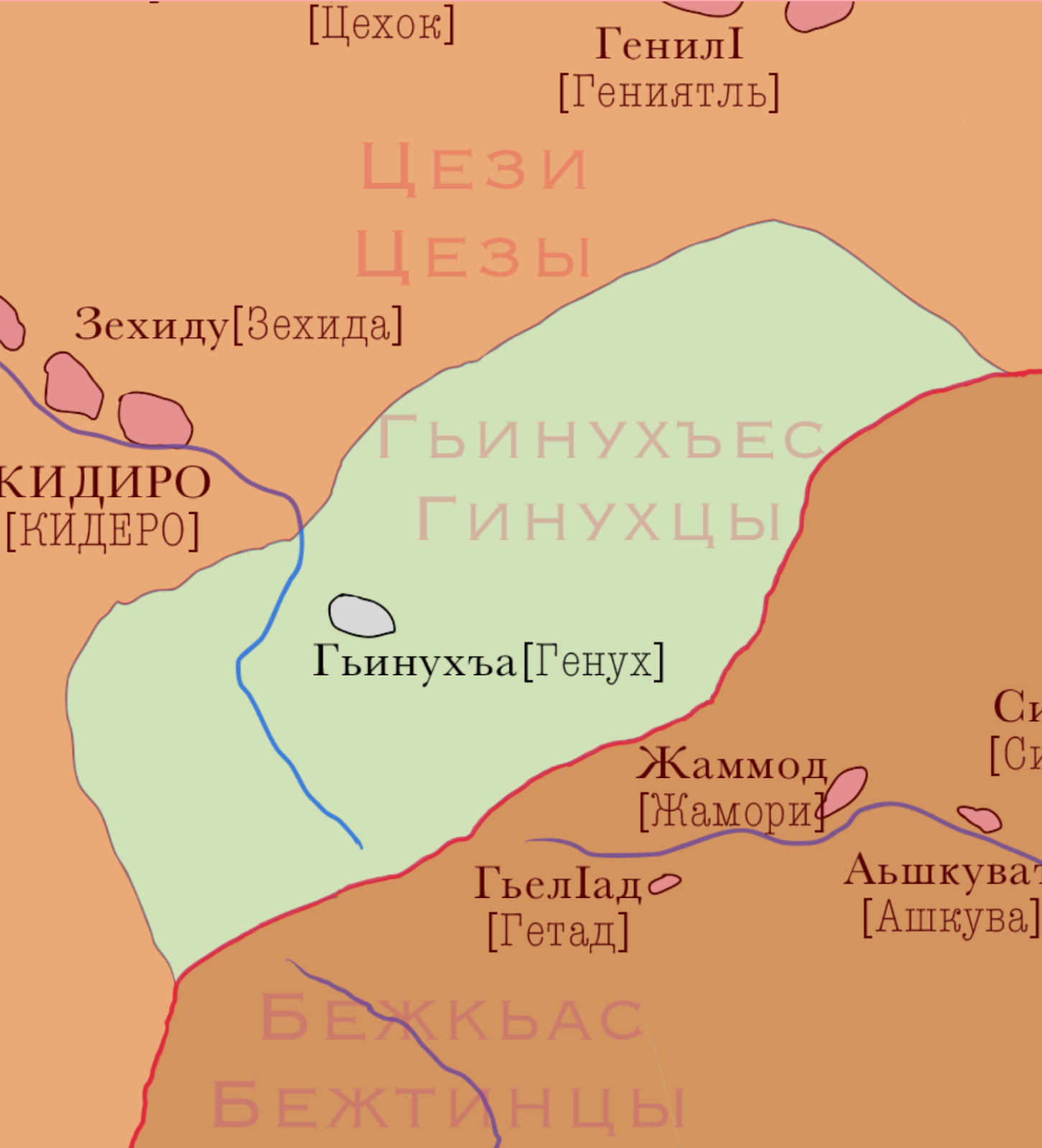

Total population
- c. 4,000 (highest est.)

Regions with significant populations
- Russia: Dagestan: 630 (2021)

Languages
- Hinuq, Avar, Russian

Religion
- Sunni Islam

Related ethnic groups
- Tsez, Khwarshi, Avars and other Northeast Caucasian peoples

The Hinukh (Hinukh: гьинухъес hinuqes, Avar: гьинухъесел, romanized: hinuqesel) are a people of Dagestan living in 2 villages: Genukh, Tsuntinsky District, their "parent village"; and Novomonastyrskoe, Kizlyarsky District where they settled later and live together with Avars and Dargins and also in the cities of Dagestan. They are being assimilated by the Caucasian Avars.

== History ==
The Hinukh ethnonym "hinukh" comes from the word hino/hinu, "the road" (suffix -kh/-kho form essive case "at the road", "on the road"). The Bezhta people call them "гьинухъаса" (hinukhasa), the Georgians "ლეკები" (lekebi) or "დიდოელები" (didoelebi), and the Tsez people "гьинузи" (hinuzi).

In the official documents and the censuses the Hinukh did not appear as an independent ethnic group. After the forcible deportation of the Vainakh people and disbandment of the Chechen–Ingush ASSR, they were (together with some other Avar–Andi–Dido peoples) resettled in Vedensky District which was given to Dagestan ASSR. After the rehabilitation of the Vainakh peoples in 1958 they settled back in their native lands.

In 1960s the population of the Hinukh people was estimated to be 200. 2002 Russian Census showed their number as 531. They were considered as a subgroup of Avar people in this census. 2021 Russian census registered 630 Hinukh, nearly all living in Dagestan.

== Genetics ==
According to genetic studies in 2016, the following haplogroups are found to predominate among Hinukh:

- J1 (56%)
- G2 (44%)

== Religion ==
The Hinukh people are overwhelmingly Sunni Muslims. They converted to Islam possibly in the late 18th century, through the mountain guides from the Free Community of Gidatl and Khunzakh and the Bezhta people, who were already Muslims.

== Language ==
The Hinukh language is a Northeast Caucasian language of the Tsezic subgroup. Beside their native Hinukh language, many also speak Avar, Tsez, Russian and often also other languages of the region.

The first information about Archi language was in a letter from Peter von Uslar to Franz Anton Schiefner dated 1865, where he writes about a special language in Inukho aul (i.e. Hinukh). The first written material about Hinukh language was a list of 16 words with their counterparts in Tsez language, given by the Belarusian ethnographer and folklorist Aleksandr Serzhputovkiy in his work about the Tsez people in 1916.

Linguist Nicholas Marr classified Hinukh language as an independent language, but erroneously described it as a language "between Avar and Dido languages". It was classified as a dialect of the Tsez language by the linguists D.S. Imnaishvili and E.S. Lomtadze.

The Hinukh people and Hinukh language were not in the list of the ethnic groups and languages of Dagestan for a long time. They appeared only in the second edition of the Great Soviet Encyclopedia.
