= Khwarshi =

Khwarshi may refer to:

- Khwarshi people: A people of the Caucasus in southwestern Dagestan, Russia
- Khwarshi language: The Tsezic language spoken by the Khwarshi people
