= Lative case =

Grammatical case

In grammar, the lative (/ˈleɪtɪv/ LAY-tiv; abbreviated LAT) is a grammatical case which indicates motion to a location. It corresponds to the English prepositions "to" and "into". The lative case belongs to the group of the general local cases together with the locative and separative case. The term derives from the Latin lat-, the supine stem of ferre, "to bring, carry".

The lative case is typical of the Uralic languages and it was one of the Proto-Uralic cases. It still exists in many Uralic languages, such as Finnish, Erzya, Moksha, and Meadow Mari.

It is also found in the Dido languages, such as Tsez, Bezhta, and Khwarshi, as well as in the South Caucasian languages, such as Laz or Lazuri (see Laz grammar).

== Finnish ==
In Finnish, the lative case is largely obsolete. It still occurs in various adverbs: alas, alemmas, "down, further down", kauas, kauemmas "(moving) far away, farther away", pois "(going) away", and rannemmas "towards and closer to the shore" (derives from 'ranta' [shore]). The lative suffix is usually -s.

In modern Finnish, it has been superseded by a more complicated system of locative cases and enclitics, and the original -s has merged with another lative or locative suffix and turned into the modern inessive, elative, illative and translative suffixes.

== Meadow Mari ==
In Meadow Mari, the usage of the lative is restricted compared to that of the illative case. Whereas the illative can be used freely in connection with verbs indicating motion into/to/towards something, the lative occurs typically with only a smaller number of such verbs. Some examples of these are: кодаш kodaš "to remain, to stay", шинчаш šinčaš "to sit down", шочаш šočaš "to be born", сакаш sakaš "to hang up, to hang on", пышташ põštaš "to put, to place", кушкаш kuškaš "to grow (intransitive)". In many cases, both the illative and the lative cases can be used with a verb. Note that some of the verbs, such as шочаш or кушкаш, do not indicate motion towards a place.

Ковам Тойметсола ялеш кресаньык ешеш шочын.
kova-m Tojmetsola jal-eš kresan’õk ješ-eš šoč-õn
grandmother-POSS.1SG Toymetsola village-LAT peasant family-LAT be.born-PST
"My grandmother was born in the village of Toymetsola into a peasant family."

Сумкатым пӱкенеш пыште да диванеш шич.
sumka-t-õm püken-eš põšte da divan-eš šič
bag-POSS.2SG-ACC chair-LAT put.IMP and couch-LAT sit.IMP
"Put your bag on the chair and sit down on the couch."

The lative case in Meadow Mari can also fulfill a few auxiliary functions. It can indicate the cause for an action or under what circumstances the action takes place:

Йоча-влак йӱреш нӧреныт.
joča-vlak jür-eš nör-en-õt
child-PL rain-LAT soak-PST-3PL
"The children got soaked in the rain."

A noun in the lative can express a period of time in which something (repeatedly) takes place:

Тый кечеш мыняр гана кочкат?
tõj keč-eš mõn’ar gana kočk-at?
you.SG day-LAT how.many time eat-2SG
"How many times a day do you eat?"

A noun in the lative can be used to indicate how someone or something is regarded, for what they are held:

Ивук пийжым эн сай йолташеш шотла.
Ivuk pij-ž-õm en saj joltaš-eš šotl-a
Ivuk dog-POSS.3SG-ACC most good friend-LAT consider-3SG
"Ivuk considers his dog his best friend."

A noun in the lative can express by what means something is transferred, relocated, or undergoes a change.

Йошкар-Олашке автобусеш толынна.
Joškar-Ola-ške avtobus-eš tol-õn-na
Yoshkar-Ola-ILL bus-LAT come-PST-1PL
"We came to Yoshkar-Ola by bus."

Тулеш кӱктымӧ пареҥге пеш тамле.
tul-eš kükt-õmö pareŋge peš tamle
fire-LAT bake-PASS potato very tasty
"Potatoes cooked in fire are very tasty."

== Tsez ==
In the Northeast Caucasian languages, such as Tsez, the lative also takes up the functions of the dative case in marking the recipient or beneficent of an action. By some linguists, they are still regarded as two separate cases in those languages although the suffixes are exactly the same for both cases. Other linguists list them separately only for the purpose of separating syntactic cases from locative cases. An example with the ditransitive verb "show" (literally: "make see") is given below:

Кидбā ужихъор кIетIу биквархо.
kidb-ā uži-qo-r kʼetʼu b-ikʷa-r-xo
girl:OBL-ERG boy-POSS-DAT/LAT cat:[III]:ABS III-see-CAUS-PRES
"The girl shows the cat to the boy."

The dative/lative is also used to indicate possession, as in the example below; there is no such verb for "to have":

Кидбехъор кIетIу зовси.
kidbe-qo-r kʼetʼu zow-si
girl:OBL-POSS-DAT/LAT cat:ABS be:PST-PST
"The girl had a cat."

The dative/lative case usually occurs, as in the examples above, in combination with another suffix as poss-lative case; it should not be regarded as a separate case, as many of the locative cases in Tsez are constructed analytically. They are actually a combination of two case suffixes. See Tsez language#Locative case suffixes for further details.

Verbs of perception or emotion (like "see", "know", "love", "want") also require the logical subject to stand in the dative/lative case, note that in this example the "pure" dative/lative without its POSS-suffix is used.

ГIалир ПатIи йетих.
ʻAli-r Patʼi y-eti-x
Ali-DAT/LAT Fatima:[II]:ABS II-love-PRES
"Ali loves Fatima."
