= Bezhta =

Bezhta (or alternatively Bezheta, also called Kapucha or Kapuchin) could refer to:

- the Bezhta language
- the Bezhta people

== See also ==
- "kapuchin" may be a misspelling of capuchin, a New World monkey of the genus Cebus, an order of Roman Catholic friars, among other meanings.
