= Inkhoqwari language =

Northeast Caucasian language

Inkhoqwari
- Inxokvari
- i'qqo
- Native to: Russia
- Region: Tsumadinsky District
- Ethnicity: Inkhokwari people, a subgroup of the Khwarshi people
- Native speakers: 2,190 (2009)
- Language family: Northeast Caucasian: Tsezic; Bezhta–Hunzib–Khwarshi; Khwarshi; Inkhoqwari
- Dialects: Inkhoqwari proper; Kwantlada; Santlada; Khvaini

Language codes
- ISO 639-3: –
- Glottolog: inxo1238 Inxokvari

- Person: ixižes
- People: ixizo
- Country: iqqo (name of Inkhoqwari village)

The Inkhoqwari language (Inkhoqwari: i'qqo) is a Northeast Caucasian language of the Tsezic group, closely related to, and typically considered a dialect of, Khwarshi. It was separated from Khwarshi in the 9th century.

== Classification ==
Formerly considered a dialect of Khwarshi, of which it shares many features, they differ in phonology and lexicon to the point of mutual unintelligibility to neighboring peoples. According to linguists, the similarity between the two varieties would be around 91%, which is more than enough for Inkhoqwari to be considered its own language.

== Usage ==
Inkhoqwari is entirely a spoken language only spoken inside the home, and is unwritten. Yet the Inkhoqwari manage to keep their language and culture as best as they can, as they live far apart from each other in isolated mountain villages.

Inkhoqwari children, like those of neighbouring peoples, spend their first five years at school being taught in Avar, and afterward in Russian.

It is difficult to find the amount of speakers but it is believed to be around 700, versus 400 for Khwarshi.

== Dialects ==
Inkhoqwari has four dialects:

- Xvaini (spoken in the village of Khvayni)
- Kvantlada (spoken in the village of Kvantlada)
- Santlada (spoken in the village of Santlada)
- Inkhoqwari proper

The Kvantlada and Santlada dialects are very close to each other.

== Influence from other languages ==
Inkhoqwari has been influenced by Avar, Georgian and Russian. A number of Arabic, Persian and Turkic loanwords have also permeated Inkhoqwari through Avar. Andic, mainly Tindi, words are more frequent in Inkhoqwari than in Khwarshi.

== Lexical comparison ==
Gloss	Inkhoqwari	Khwarshi
bull	buġa	boju
cow	zie	ziġi
horse	soro	sajro
fox	zor	zaru
spider	boceru	zabarala
bee	por	par

== See also ==
- Khwarshi language
- Language or dialect
