= Apudessive case =

Grammatical case

Apudessive case (abbreviated APUD) is used for marking a juxtaposing spatial relation, or location next to something ("next to the house"). It is found in Tsez, Bezhta and other Northeast Caucasian languages. The name “Apudessive” derives from the Latin word apud, meaning “at” or “by.”

In the Aghul language, transitive verbs can mark the agent in a causative construction with the apudessive case. It is also possible for intransitive verbs in combination with a causative construction to be marked with the apudessive, however it is more common for such a marking to occur with transitive verbs. In Aghul, apudessive marking is exclusive to sentences in which the agent of a causative construction can express control over the situation. Inanimate agents in such constructions are never marked with the apudessive case.

The Aghul sentence is an example of the usage of the apudessive case with intransitive verbs.

dad.a uč.i-n uqːub-ar.i-l-di gada.ji-w χul.a-as hiš.a-s q’.u-ne
father(ERG) REFL-GEN beating-PL-SUP-LAT son-APUD house-IN.ELA flee.IPFV-INF do.PFV-PERF
Father’s beating made his son run away from home.
(lit. “by his beating father made son run away from home”)

Other languages, such as Tsez, mark the Apudessive case with postpositions. The word gogoa-ɣ is marked for the apudessive with the postposition ɣ. These markings can be further combined with other suffixes. For example, the word huni-χ-oz contains both an apudessive marker and a translative suffix.
