= Khwarshi people =

Ethnic group in Dagestan, Russia

Khwarshi
Khvarshi: Аᴴкьи́зо
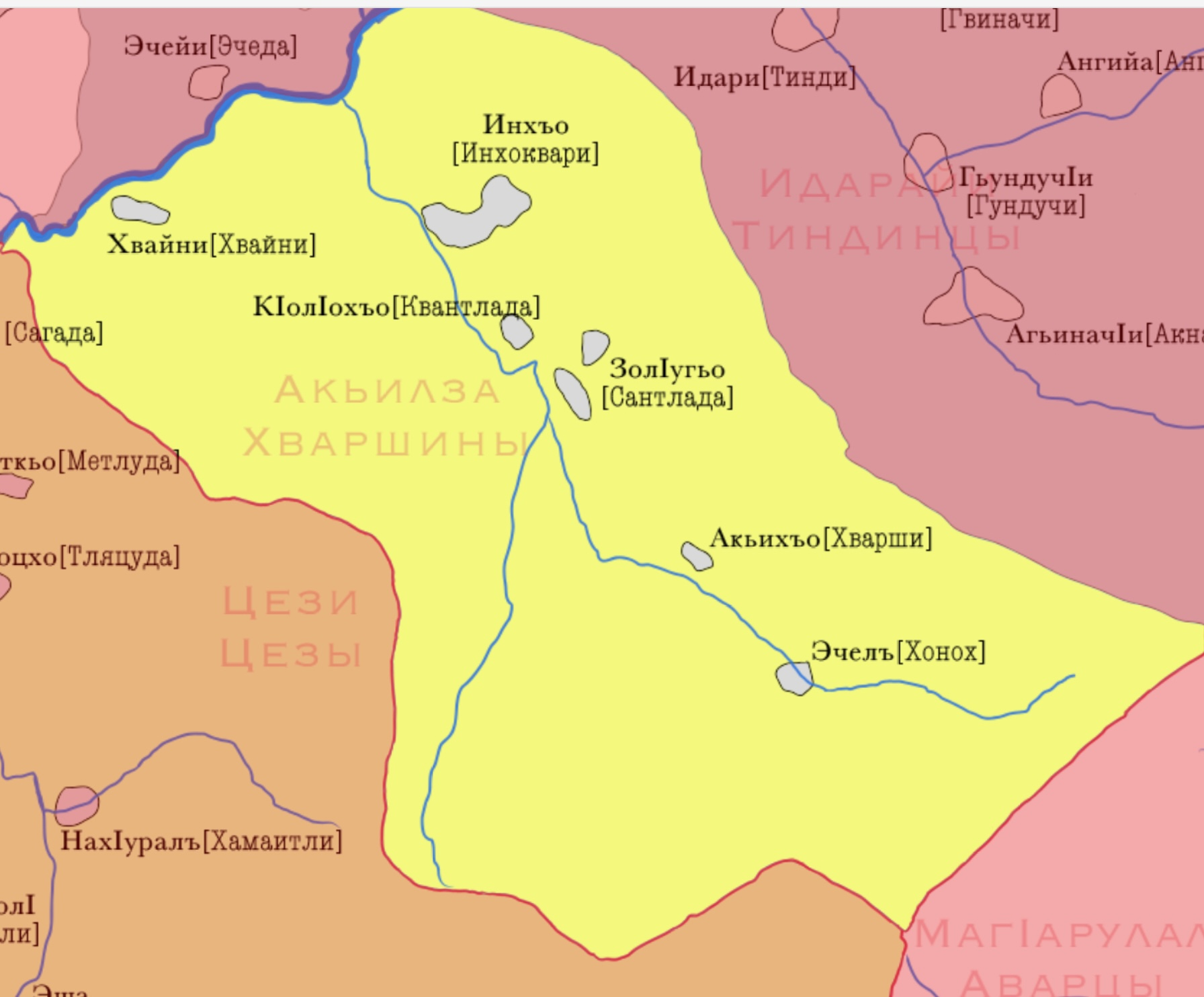

Total population
- c. 8,500 (highest est.)

Regions with significant populations
- Russia: Dagestan: 827 (2021 census)

Languages
- Khwarshi, Russian

Religion
- Sunni Islam

Related ethnic groups
- Bezhta, Hunzib and other Northeast Caucasian peoples

The Khwarshi people are a North Caucasian people living in Dagestan, in several small settlements. The Khwarshi are originally from the southeastern part of Tsumadinsky District, where seven Khwarshi settlements are located: Upper- and Lower Inkhokwari village (iqqo), Kwantlada village (kʼoλoqo), Santlada village (zoλuho), Khwarshi village (aλʼiqo), Khonokh (honoho) and Khwayni village (ečel). They do not have an ethnonym for themselves as a united people, but instead they refer to themselves according to the settlement they are from. Thus they call themselves the Inkhokwari people (ixizo), the Kwantlada people (kʼoλozo), the Santlada people (zoλozo), the Khwarshi people (aλʼizo), the Khonokh people (honozo) and the Khwayni people (ečezo).

During August 1944, the Khwarshi were deported to Vedeno and Rityalb, but by 1957 30% of them had returned to the traditional settlements again, while the rest had emigrated to the Kizilyurtovsky- and Khasavyurtovsky districts, meaning that today there is also Khwarshis to be found in Komsomolskoe and Kizilyurt in Kizilyurtovsky, and in Oktyabrskoe, Pervomayskoe and Mutsalaul in Khasavyurtovsky. In fact, today the majority of Khwarshis, some 7,000, live outside the traditional settlements, while the remaining 1,500 live in the settlements.

They speak Khwarshi, a Tsezic language. They are traditionally Sunni Muslims, having converted around the 16th century due to the influence of Sufi missionaries. They live off by engaging in agriculture.
