= Hinuq language =

Northeast Caucasian language

Hinuq
- Hinukh, Ginukh
- гьинузас мец hinuzas mec
- Pronunciation: [hiˈnuzas mɛt͡s]
- Native to: North Caucasus
- Region: Southern Dagestan
- Ethnicity: Hinukh people
- Native speakers: 635 (2020 census)
- Language family: Northeast Caucasian: Tsezic; Tsez–Hinukh; Hinuq

Language codes
- ISO 639-3: gin
- Glottolog: hinu1240
- ELP: Hinukh
- Hinuq

- Hinukh is classified as Definitely Endangered by the UNESCO Atlas of the World's Languages in Danger (2010)

The Hinuq language (autonym: гьинузас мец hinuzas mec, also known as Hinukh, Hinux, Ginukh, or Ginux) is a Northeast Caucasian language of the Tsezic subgroup. It is spoken by about 200 to 500 people, the Hinukhs, in the Tsuntinsky District of southwestern Dagestan, mainly in the village of Genukh (Hinukh: Hino). Hinukh is very closely related to Tsez, but they are not entirely mutually intelligible.

Only half of the children of the village speak the Hinukh language. As Hinukh is unwritten, Avar and Russian are used as literary languages. Hinukh is not considered to have dialects, but due to its linguistic proximity to Tsez, it was once considered a Tsez dialect.

The Hinukh people were already mentioned in the Georgian chronicles of the Early Middle Ages. The language itself was first described in 1916 by Russian ethnographer A. Serzhputovsky.

== Phonology ==
=== Vowels ===
Hinukh distinguishes 6 vowel qualities /a, e, i, o, u, y/, all of which can be either long or short. Two vowels can occur pharyngealized: /aˤ/ and /eˤ/. However, these are only used by the older generation. Today they are usually replaced by /i/.

Vowels of Hinuq
	Front		Central	Back
	unr.	rnd.	Central	Back
High	ɪ	ʏ		ʊ
Mid	ɛ			ɔ
Low			a	

Hinuq also has 6 diphthongs: [ʊɪ], [aɪ], [ɔɪ], [ɛɪ], [aʊ], and [ɔʊ].

=== Consonants ===
Like many Caucasian languages, Hinuq has a large number of consonants. In addition to voiced and unvoiced consonants, there are also ejectives.

Consonants of Hinuq
		Labial	Dental/Alveolar		Palatal (-alveolar)	Velar		Uvular		Pharyngeal	Glottal
		Labial	median	lateral	Palatal (-alveolar)	plain	lab.	plain	lab.	Pharyngeal	Glottal
Nasal		m	n̪								
Plosive	voiced	b	d			ɡ	ɡʷ				
Plosive	voiceless	p	t			k	kʷ	q	qʷ	(ʡ)	ʔ
Plosive	ejective	pʼ	tʼ			kʼ	kʷʼ	qʼ	qʷʼ		
Affricate	voiceless		ts	tɬ	tʃ						
Affricate	ejective		tsʼ	tɬʼ	tʃʼ						
Fricative	voiced		z		ʒ			ʁ	ʁʷ		
Fricative	voiceless	(f)	s	ɬ	ʃ			χ	χʷ	ħ	h
Sonorant			r	l	j		w				

All consonants can be geminated except for /pʼ, tsʼ, ħ, ʡ, ʔ/, and labialized consonants. Geminates occur both in stems and at morpheme boundaries.

=== Syllable Structure ===
Native Hinuq stems can have the structure CV, CV:, or CVC (where C is a consonant, V is a short vowel, and V: is a long vowel). Inflected words can also have the structures CV:C and CVyC. Consonant clusters of two consonants can occur between vowels, and not all combinations of consonants are permitted. To break up illegal consonant clusters, an epenthetic /e/ or /i/ can be inserted between them, depending on the context.

To avoid consecutive vowels between morpheme boundaries, either the first vowel can be deleted, or a glide can be inserted between them.

== Morphology ==
Hinuq is an agglutinative language which mainly makes use of suffixes.

=== Nouns ===
Hinukh is an ergative-absolutive language, and nouns inflect for case and number. Like most Northeast Caucasian languages, shows a rich case system. There are six non-spatial cases (Absolutive, Ergative, First Genitive, Second Genitive, Dative, Instrumental) as well as 35 spatial cases. The spatial case system itself consists of two categories, location (cont, in, sub, spr, at, aloc, iloc) and orientation, expressed by the use of direction markers (Essive, Lative, First Ablative, Second Ablative, Directional).

==== Stem Formation ====
Hinuq distinguishes a direct and oblique stem. Case suffixes are primarily added to the oblique stem. To form the oblique stem, there are different options, including oblique suffixes; epenthetic vowels; deletion of the base-stem-final consonant, vowel, or semivowel; stress shift; or ablaut. The oblique stem suffixes are -mo, -a, -la, -i, -ya, -o, -li, -yi, -ra, -ro, -ru, -do, -u, -na, -nu. -mo is the most productive of these suffixes. Some examples of nominal declension are given below.

		gani 'bull' Vowel stem	čeq 'forest' Consonantic stem	humer 'face' Consonantic stem
Singular	Absolutive Ergative Genitive 1 Genitive 2 cont-Essive at-Essive	gani ganíː ganiš ganižo ganiɬ ganiqo	čeq čeqi čeqiš čeqzo čeqeɬ čeqqo	humer humelii humeliš humeližo humeliɬ humeliqo
Plural	Absolutive Ergative Genitive 1 Genitive 2 cont-Essive at-Essive	ganibe ganižay ganižas ganižazo ganižaɬ ganižaqo	čeqbe čeqzay čeqzas čeqzazo čeqzaɬ čeqzaqo	humerbe humeližay humeližas humeližazo humeližaɬ humeližaqo

==== Number ====
Hinuq nouns distinguish between singular and plural. The absolutive plural suffix is almost invariably formed with -be. The oblique plural stem is formed with the suffix -za (or -ža if it follows an /i/). The oblique plural suffix is attached to the base stem, and case suffixes are then attached to the oblique plural.

Absolutive and Oblique Plurals
	'bull'	'cat'
Absolutive	gani-be	k'et'(u)-be
Ergative	gani-ža-y	k'et'-za-y
Genitive 1	gani-ža-s	k'et'-za-s
Genitive 2	gani-ža-zo	k'et'-za-zo
cont-Essive	gani-ža-ɬ	k'et'-za-ɬ
at-Essive	gani-ža-qo	k'et'-za-qo

==== Case ====
The six non-spatial case suffixes are:

Case	Suffix
Absolutive	no suffix
Ergative	-i (-y)
Genitive 1	-s (-š)
Genitive 2	-zo (-žo)
Dative	-z (-ž)
Instrumental	-d

===== Absolutive =====
The absolutive noun phrase can act as the single argument of an intransitive verb:

had essni sasaqo b-iƛ'i-yo hayɬi-do
these brother.PL in.the.morning HPL-go-PRS there-DIR
'These brothers are going there in the morning'

the patient/theme of a transitive (or extended transitive) verb:

hayɫu-y b-ux-no k'et'u
she.OBL-ERG III-buy-UWPST cat
'She bought a cat'

and the stimulus of an experiencer verb:

haw haze-z y-uhe-s y-aši-š goɫ
she they.OBL-DAT II-die-RES II-find-RES be
'They found her dead'

===== Ergative =====
The ergative suffix is -i after consonants and -y after vowels, and marks the agentive argument of transitive verbs.

hayɫo čanaqan-i kekir-no haw coy hawa-ƛ'o-do
that.OBL hunter-ERG let-UWPST that eagle air-SPR-DIR
'The hunter let the eagle (fly) into the air'

===== Genitive =====
Hinuq has two genitive suffixes: First (direct) Genitive, and Second (oblique) Genitive. The First Genitive has the suffix -s (or -š if it follows an /i/), and is used when the head noun is in the absolutive case. If the head noun is in an oblique case, it takes the Second Genitive suffix -zo (or -žo if it follows an /i/).

The genitive cases are primarily used to show both alienable and inalienable possession.

obu-s buƛe
father-GEN1 house
'father's house'

obu-zo beƛeː
father-GEN2 house.IN
'In father's house'

The genitive cases can also be used to denote part-whole relationships, a quality or property, and the material of an object.

===== Dative =====
The dative case marks recipients, experiencers, and beneficiaries, and has the suffix -z (or -ž after /i/). Experiencer verbs include -eti- 'want', -aši- 'find, get', -eq'i- 'know', -ike- 'see', and others.

k'onc'u-be at'ek'-a r-eti-yo gom diž
leg-PL wet-INF NHPL-want-ICVB be.NEG I.DAT
'I do not want wet legs'

The dative case is also used in benefactive and malefactive constructions.

[r-ux-no haɫo-y tupi] caƛi-yo haɫu boɫi-ž
V-take-CVB he.OBL gun shoot-PRS this.OBL deer-DAT
'He takes the gun and shoots the deer'

===== Instrumental =====
The instrumental case suffix is -d, and expresses the use of instruments, body parts, and animal used for work (but never for humans).

essu-y haɫu gulu-d b-eƛe-s moči
brother-ERG this.OBL horse-INS III-plough-PST field
'The brother ploughed the field with this horse'

===== Spatial Cases =====
Hinuq has 35 spatial cases that run along two dimensions: 7 location markers (Contact, Inside, Under (sub), On (spr), At, Animate Location, and Inanimate Location) and 5 orientation markers (Essive, Lative, Ablative 1, Ablative 2, and Directional).

Spatial Cases
	Essive	Lative	Ablative 1	Ablative 2	Directional
cont	-ɫ	-ɫ-e-r	-ɫ-e-s	-ɫ-e-zo	-ɫ-e-do
in	-V / -ma	-V-r / -ma-r	-V-s / -ma-s	-V-zo / -ma-zo	-V-do / -ma-do
sub	-ƛ	-ƛ-e-r	-ƛ-e-s	-ƛ-e-zo	-ƛ-e-do
spr	-ƛ'o	-ƛ'o-r	-ƛ'o-s	-ƛ'o-zo	-ƛ'o-do
at	-qo	-qo-r	-qo-s	-qo-zo	-qo-do
aloc	-de	-de-r	-de-s	-de-zo	-de-do
iloc	-ho	-go-r	-ho-s	-ho-zo	-ho-do

When combined with the location marker, the orientation marker denotes the kind of motion conveyed, e.g., the Lative indicates motion towards a goal:

de ixu-ho-do iƛ'i-š
I river-ILOC-LAT come-PST
'I (masc.) went to the river'

Spatial cases can also have metaphorical meanings, like temporal phrases.

de hasaqo iɫra-ƛ'o y-ix-ƛ'os goɫ
I in.the.morning six.OBL-SPR II-get.up-HAB be
'I (fem.) get up at 6 o'clock in the morning'

==== Nominal Derivation ====
Hinuq has several suffixes for nominal derivation:

Common Derivational Suffixes
Suffix	Meaning	Example
-ɫi (from Avar)	Abstract nouns (from nouns, adverbs, adjectives)	maduhal 'neighbor', maduhal-ɫi 'neighborhood'
-be	Names of groups of people (from place names)	qazaq 'Georgia', qazaq-be 'Georgians'
-nak'u	Agentive nouns, activities, and tools (from verbs)	-ox-a 'leave, escape', -oxa-nak'u 'escapee'
-qan (from Avar)	Professions (from nouns)	nuce 'honey', nuco-qan 'beekeeper'
-qu	Professions and tools (from nouns)	kak 'prayer', kak-mo-qu 'prayer mat'

=== Verbs ===
Verbs in Hinuq can consist of just a stem, or combined with prefixes and suffixes. Verbs can be inflected for tense, aspect, mood, evidentiality, polarity, illocutionary force, gender, and number.

There are five grammatical genders in Hinuq which are expressed through verbal prefixes, and only on vowel-initial stems (though not all vowel-initial stems take prefixes). Gender is distinguished by the combination of prefixes for singular and plural agreement:

Gender Prefixes
	I	II	III	IV	V
Singular	Ø-	y-	b-	y-	r-
Plural	b-	b-/r-	r-	r-	r-

Example:

ked-i ac y-ɣi-yo
girl-ERG door(IV) IV-open-PRS
"The girl opens the door"

Forker (2013) identifies four different conjugation classes based on the verbal stem endings.

- Class 1 verbs have consonant-final stems.

When this suffix is added, the final stem consonant is lengthened, and ejectives lose their ejectivization.

Verb	PRS/ICVB	Translation
nox-	noxxo	'come'
-uƛ'-	-uƛƛo	'fear'

- Class 2 consists of verbs with stem-final /i/
- Class 3 consists of verbs with stem-final /e/
- Class 4 consists of verb stems that end in a long vowel

The most common Class 4 stem-final long vowel is /aː/, though it is also attested with /iː/, /oː/, and /uː/.

Hinuq verbs are morphologically complex, but follow a "template" with slots for different types of affixes. All slots besides the root, however, are optional. The template is:

(Agreement) + Root + (Derivation) + (Inflection) + (Negation) + (Inflection) + (Other)

Example verb (k'ilik'-, 'wash') with derivational, inflectional, and negation suffixes:

ø-k'ilik'-do:-ɬ-ø-ø-me-ø-ø
k'ilik'-do:-ɬ-me
wash-ANTIP-POT-NEG
'not able to wash'

==== Tense, Aspect, Mood ====
Tenses are marked synthetically on the verbs by means of affixes, or periphrastically with auxiliary verbs. Hinuq has 5 simple tenses and 14 complex (i.e., periphrastic) tenses.

The simple tenses are Indefinite Future, Intentional Future, General Tense, Simple Present, and Simple Past.

Simple Tense Conjugation
	Suffixes and Allomorphs		-iƛʼi- 'go'	
	Affirmative	Negative	Affirmative	Negative
Indefinite Fut.	-as	# (Note: 1. means that no such form exists)	-iƛʼ-as	#
Intentional Fut.	-n, -a-n	-mi-n, -a-mi-n	-iƛʼ-an	-iƛʼ-amin
General Tense	-Ø	-me	-iƛʼi	-iƛʼi-me
Simple Present	-o, -yo, -ho	#	-iƛʼi-yo	#
Simple Past	-s, -š, -iš	-s-me, -š-me, -iš-me	-iƛʼi-š	-iƛʼi-šme

As its sister languages Bezhta and Tsez, Hinukh differentiates between "witnessed/simple past" (ending in -s or -š) and "unwitnessed past" (in -no); the present tense is marked with the suffix -ho. In the future tense, Hinukh distinguishes a "direct future" (-n), which is used only in the first person and an "indirect future" (-s) used for all other persons.

=== Numerals ===
The numeral system is vigesimal, which means that it is a base-20 system, a feature commonly found among the languages of the Caucasus.
