= Khwarshi language =

Northeast Caucasian language spoken in Dagestan

Khwarshi
- Khwarshi–Inkhoqwari
- аᴴкьи́зас мыц aⁿƛ̓ízas myc kedaes hikwa
- Pronunciation: [ãt͡ɬʼizas mɨt͡s] [kedaes hikwa]
- Native to: North Caucasus
- Region: Southwestern Dagestan
- Ethnicity: Khwarshi people
- Native speakers: 3,300 (2020 census); 8,500 (2005-2009)
- Language family: Northeast Caucasian: Tsezic; Bezhta–Hunzib–Khwarshi; Khwarshi
- Dialects: Inkhoqwari; Khwarshi Proper

Language codes
- ISO 639-3: khv
- Glottolog: khva1239
- ELP: Khvarshi
- Khwarshi

- Khvarshi is classified as Definitely Endangered by the UNESCO Atlas of the World's Languages in Danger (2010)

Khwarshi (also spelled Xvarshi, Khvarshi, Khvarshi: аᴴкьи́зас мыц) is a Northeast Caucasian language spoken in the Tsumadinsky-, Kizilyurtovsky- and Khasavyurtovsky districts of Dagestan by the Khwarshi people. The exact number of speakers is not known, but the linguist Zaira Khalilova, who has carried out fieldwork in the period from 2005 to 2009, gives the figure 8,500. Other sources give much lower figures, such as Ethnologue with the figure 1,870 and the latest population census of Russia with the figure 3,296. The low figures are because many Khwarshi have registered themselves as being Avar speakers, because Avar is their literary language.

There are six dialects of the Khwarshi language based on their geographical distribution. The dialects are: Upper and Lower Inkhokwari, Kwantlada, Santlada, Khwayni and Khwarshi Proper, originating in their respective villages in the Tsumadinsky district. Due to emigration, Kwantlada-, Upper and Lower Inkhokwari–speaking communities also exist in Oktyabrskoe, Santlada-speaking communities exist in Pervomayskoe and Khwarshi Proper–speaking communities exist in Mutsalaul.

== Phonology ==
The phoneme inventory of Khwarshi is large, with about 87 distinct phonemes. Notable phonological processes include assimilation, vowel harmony, and nasalization occurring. The syllabic structure of Khwarshi is also quite simple, with (C)V(C) being the most common structure, of which V(C) is only permitted word-initially.

=== Vowels ===
Khwarshi has a total number of 21 vowel phonemes, including vowel length and nasalization.

	Front	Central	Back
Close	i	ɨ	u
Close-mid	e		o
Open	a		

All the vowels above also have a long counterpart, which are always in stressed syllables. All vowels can occur in closed syllables (i.e. (C)VC), and all except /ɨ/ occur in open syllables (i.e. (C)V). /ɨ/ does not occur in the Khwarshi Proper and Inkhokwari dialects.

	Front	Back
Close	ĩ	ũ
Close-mid	ẽ	õ
Open	ã	

- All the nasal vowels above except /ĩ/ have a long counterpart.
- There is no nasalized version of /ɨ/.
- The Khwarshi Proper dialect does not have nasalized vowels and replaces these with their non-nasalized counterparts.

=== Consonants ===
Khwarshi has 66 consonants:

		Bilabial		Alveolar					Palatal		Velar			Uvular				Pharyngeal	Glottal	
		Bilabial		central		lateral			Palatal		Velar			Uvular				Pharyngeal	Glottal	
		plain	phar.	plain	lab.	plain	lab.	pal.	plain	lab.	plain	lab.	phar.	plain	lab.	phar.	phar.+lab.	Pharyngeal	plain	phar.
Nasal		m	mˤ	n																
Plosive	voiceless	p	pˤ	t	(tʷ)						k	kʷ	kˤ	q	qʷ	qˤ				
Plosive	voiced	b	bˤ	d	dʷ						g	gʷ	gˤ							
Plosive	ejective	pʼ	pˤʼ	tʼ	tʷʼ						kʼ	kʷʼ	kˤʼ	qʼ	qʷʼ	qˤʼ	qˤʷʼ			
Affricate	voiceless			t͡s		t͡ɬ			t͡ʃ											
Affricate	ejective			t͡sʼ	t͡sʷʼ	t͡ɬʼ	t͡ɬʷʼ		t͡ʃʼ	t͡ʃʷʼ										
Fricative	voiceless			s	sʷ	ɬ			ʃ	ʃʷ	x			χ	χʷ	χˤ	χˤʷ	ħ	h	hˤ
Fricative	voiced			z	zʷ				ʒ	ʒʷ				ʁ	ʁʷ	ʁˤ	ʁˤʷ	ʕ		
Trill				r																
Approximant						l		lʲ	j			w								

It is not clear whether /tʷ/ is present in Khwarshi or not, as Zaira Khalilova does not include it in her chart of consonants, but nevertheless provides a minimal pair indicating there is a distinction between /t/ and /tʷ/: /eta/ "touch" and /etʷa/ "fly". Therefore, it is shown in parentheses in the chart above.

All the consonants can be found in native vocabulary, but some of them are however more rare than others, and some are mostly found in loanwords, such as /ʕ/ which almost only occur in loanwords of Arabic origin. Another example is /x/, found only in loanwords of Avar origin.

The palatalized consonant and all the pharyngealized consonants are not found in Khwarshi Proper, but can be found in all the other dialects. Consider for instance the Khwarshi Proper word /χililːu/ "drunk", which in the other dialects is /χˤilʲilʲːu/.

==== Gemination ====
Gemination is quite a common phonological process in Khwarshi, caused by grammatical processes. Gemination only occurs intervocally and not all consonants geminate. Which consonants that geminate is different according to which processes they are a part of, and it depends on the dialect as well.

Below is a list of some of the processes causing gemination:

- When suffixing the past participle-ending /-u/ to a verbal stem ending in a consonant, the final consonant is geminated, e.g. /lat͡sʼ-a/ "to eat" > /lat͡sʼ-ːu/ "eaten".
- When suffixing the present tense-ending, which generally is /-ʃe/, the final consonant is geminated, e.g. /lat͡sʼ-a/ "to eat" > /lat͡s-ːe/ "eat-pres". Notice that ejectivization is lost with the present tense-ending, while it is kept with the past participle-ending.
- When suffixing the verbal noun-ending /-nu/ to a verbal stem, the verbal noun-ending is geminated - not the final consonant, e.g. /tʼa-ja/ "to drop" > /tʼa-nːu/ "something which has been dropped".
- When infixing the potential marker /-l-/ to a verbal stem, the potential marker is geminated, e.g. /tʼa-ja/ "to drop" > /tʼa-lː-a/ "to potentially drop".
- When emphasis is needed, the consonants of some words may be geminated, e.g. /ʕezeʕan/ "much" > /ʕezːeʕan/ "much indeed". It is highly idiomatic though, and does not apply to all words.

In loanwords, geminated consonants are normally non-geminated, when adopted into the Khwarshi language. For example, the Avar word /kʼːara/ "mosquito" is found as /kʼara/ in Khwarshi. The same goes for words of Tindi origin such as /kʼːanu/ "small", which is found as /kʼanu/ in Khwarshi. Another interesting aspect of loanwords of Tindi origin in the Khwarshi language is that the consonants are ejectivized when they enter the Khwarshi language, e.g. Tindi /t͡sːikʷːa/ "small intestine" > Khwarshi /t͡sʼikʷʼa/.

== Alphabet ==
А а	Б б	В в	Г г	Гъ гъ	Гь гь	ГӀ гӀ	Д д
Е е	Ж ж	З з	И и	Й й	К к	Къ къ	Кь кь
КӀ кӀ	Л л	Лъ лъ	ЛӀ лӀ	М м	Н н	О о	П п
ПӀ пӀ	Р р	С с	Т т	ТӀ тӀ	У у	Х х	Хъ хъ
Хь хь	ХӀ хӀ	Ц ц	ЦӀ цӀ	Ч ч	ЧӀ чӀ	Ш ш	Ъ ъ
Ы ы	Ь ь	Э э

Additional letters: аᵸ, аӀ, еᵸ, еӀ, иᵸ, иӀ, ль, оᵸ, оӀ, уᵸ, уӀ, эᵸ

== Grammar ==
=== Nouns ===
Khwarshi nouns inflect for case, of which there are 51, and number, singular or plural, and belong to one of five genders, or rather noun classes. That a noun belongs to a specific class cannot be seen on the noun itself, but only through agreement.

==== Noun classes ====
There are five noun classes in the singular, but only a distinction between human and non-human in the plural, the male human and female human having merged into human, and the remaining classes into non-human.

Class	Description	Singular			Plural		
Class	Description	Prefix	Infix	Suffix	Prefix	Infix	Suffix
I	Male human	∅-^{2}	⟨w⟩	-w	b-, m-^{1}	⟨b⟩	-b
II	Female human	j-	⟨j⟩	-j	b-, m-^{1}	⟨b⟩	-b
III	Inanimate objects, and animals	b-, m-^{1}	⟨b⟩	-b	l-, n-^{1}	⟨r⟩	-l
IV	Inanimate objects, and animate objects	l-, n-^{1}	⟨r⟩	-l	l-, n-^{1}	⟨r⟩	-l
V	Inanimate objects, and names of young	j-	⟨j⟩	-j	l-, n-^{1}	⟨r⟩	-l

1. Only before nasalized vowels.
2. ∅- indicates the lack of a prefix.

Loanwords are typically assigned to noun class III or IV. Older loanwords from Arabic and Persian are usually in noun class III (e.g., askar, "troops, army"), and loans from Russian and international words are in noun class IV (e.g., komputer, restoran "restaurant").

The noun classes are visible through agreement in adjectives, adverbs, postpositions and demonstrative pronouns, and also verbs if the verb begins with a vowel. There are, however, some exceptions, like with irregular verbs in other languages. Below are some examples of such agreement.

milʲ:o b-otɬotɬ'o hẽše gul-o
2PL.GEN2 III-in.middle book.III put.IMP
"Put the book between you!"

owenu žik'o ø-ot'q'-i lʲ-lʲo atɬ-a
that man I-come-PSTW 1PL.OBL-GEN2 village-IN
"That man came to our village"

b-eč-un-tɬo b-eč-un-aj-tɬo bercina-b kandaba
HPL-be-PSTUW-NARR HPL-be-PSTUW-NEG-NARR beautiful-HPL girl.PL.ABS
"Once upon a time there were beautiful girls"

==== Cases ====
There are 8 grammatical cases in Khwarshi, and 43 locative, or spatial, cases. The grammatical cases are: absolutive, ergative, two genitive, instrumental, durative, vocative and causal. The spatial cases consist of one suffix relating to orientation, and a second suffix relating to direction.

Below are the case endings of the grammatical cases.

Absolutive	Ergative	Genitive 1	Genitive 2	Instrumental	Durative	Vocative	Causal
-∅	-(j)i	-s	-lo, -la	-z	-d	-ju	-t͡ɬeru

Below are the case endings of the locative cases.

	Essive	Lative	Versative	Ablative	Translative	Terminative
Superessive	-t͡ɬʼo	-t͡ɬʼo-l	-t͡ɬʼo-ʁul	-t͡ɬʼo-zi	-t͡ɬʼo-ʁuʒaz	-t͡ɬʼo-qʼa
Subessive	-t͡ɬ	-t͡ɬ-ul	-t͡ɬ-ʁul	-t͡ɬ-zi	-t͡ɬ-ʁuʒaz	-t͡ɬ-qʼa
Inessive	-ma	-ma-l	-ma-ʁul	-ma-zi	-ma-ʁuʒaz	-ma-qʼa
Interessive	-ɬ	-ɬ-ul	-ɬ-ʁul	-ɬ-zi	-ɬ-ʁuʒaz	-ɬ-qʼa
Adessive	-ho	-ho-l	-ho-ʁul	-ho-zi	-ho-ʁuʒaz	-ho-qʼa
Apudessive	-ʁo	-ʁo-l	-ʁo-ʁul	-ʁo-zi	-ʁo-ʁuʒaz	-ʁo-qʼa
Contessive	-qo	-qo-l	-qo-ʁul	-qo-zi	-qo-ʁuʒaz	-qo-qʼa

=== Verbs ===
Khwarshi verbs normally consist of a stem, an agreement prefix indicating noun class and number of the relevant nouns, and a suffix showing tense, aspect, mood, or the like. Only about one fourth of the Khwarshi verbs show agreement, all of them beginning with a vowel. There is a small number of verbs beginning with a vowel that do not show agreement. Verbs beginning with a consonant do not show agreement.

The verbs are very regular in Khwarshi, the only irregular verb being the auxiliary verb goli "to be", which takes neither a prefix nor a suffix and has only several non-finite forms. In the past- and future tense, however, the verb /-et͡ʃ-/ "to be situated" is used instead of goli, which may take both a prefix and a suffix.
