= Oktiabrske =

Oktiabrske Октябрське — Октябрьское
- Urban-type settlement
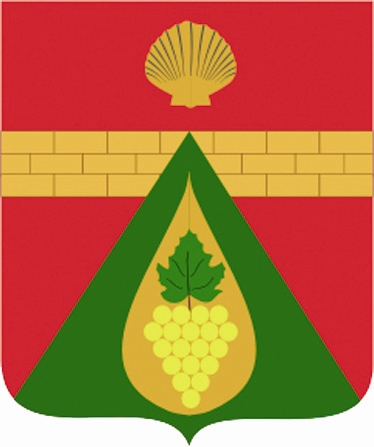
- Coat of arms
- Interactive map of Oktiabrske
- Location of Oktiabrske in Crimea
- Coordinates: 45°17′29″N 34°07′36″E
- Country: Disputed; Russia, Ukraine
- Republic: Crimea
- District: Krasnohvardiiske Raion
- First mentioned: 1784
- Town status: 1957

Government
  - Town Head: Volodymyr Dryha
- Elevation: 87 m (285 ft)

Population (2014)
  - Total: 10,218
- Time zone: UTC+4 (MSK)
- Postal code: 97060
- Area code: +380 6556
- Website: http://rada.gov.ua/

Oktiabrske (Ukrainian: Октябрське, Russian: Октябрьское), known by Ukrainian authorities (Note: The renaming has been effected by Ukraine's decommunization laws, but as Crimea is outside of Ukrainian control, this decision has had little practical effect.) as Biiuk-Onlar (Ukrainian: Біюк-Онлар, Crimean Tatar: Büyük Onlar) is an urban-type settlement in the Krasnohvardiiske Raion (district) of the Autonomous Republic of Crimea, a territory occupied by Russia as the Republic of Crimea since 2014. As of the 2001 Ukrainian Census, its population is 10,910. Current population: 10,218 (2014 Census).

== See also ==
- Krasnohvardiiske, the other urban-type settlement in Krasnohvardiiske Raion of Crimea
