= Mutsalaul =

Mutsalaul Муцалаул Мусалавул
- Selo
- Location within Republic of Dagestan Location within Russia
- Coordinates: 43°16′N 46°43′E
- Country: Russia
- Region: Republic of Dagestan
- District: Khasavyurtovsky District
- Time zone: UTC+3:00

Mutsalaul (Russian: Муцалаул; Kumyk: Мусалавул, Musalavul) is a rural locality (a selo) in Khasavyurtovsky District, Republic of Dagestan, Russia. 8,530 (2021 census); 5,809 (2002 census); 4,648 (1989 Soviet census). There are 103 streets.

== Geography ==
Mutsalaul is located 18 km northeast of Khasavyurt (the district's administrative centre) by road. Bayramaul is the nearest rural locality.
