= Tsez language =

Northeast Caucasian language

Tsez
- Dido, Cez
- цезйас мец cezyas mec
- Pronunciation: [t͡sɛzˈjas mɛt͡s] [tsejos mets]
- Native to: North Caucasus
- Region: Southern Dagestan
- Ethnicity: Tsez
- Native speakers: 18,000 (2020 census)
- Language family: Northeast Caucasian: Tsezic; Tsez–Hinukh; Tsez

Language codes
- ISO 639-3: ddo
- Glottolog: dido1241
- ELP: Tsez
- Glottopedia: Tsez
- Tsez

- Tsez is classified as Definitely Endangered by the UNESCO Atlas of the World's Languages in Danger (2010)

Tsez, also known as Dido (Tsez: цезйас мец (cezyas mec) or цез мец (cez mec)), is a Northeast Caucasian language with about 15,000 speakers (15,354 in 2002) spoken by the Tsez, a North Caucasian people in the mountainous Tsunta District of southwestern Dagestan in Russia. The name is said to derive from the Tsez word for 'eagle', but this is most likely a folk etymology. The name Dido is derived from the Georgian word დიდი (didi), meaning 'big'.

== Dialects ==
Tsez can be divided into the following dialects, with their Tsez names given in parentheses:

- Asakh (Asaq)
  - Tsebari (Ceboru)
- Mokok (Newo)
- Kidero (Kidiro)
  - Shaytl (Ešiƛʼ)
- Shapikh (Šopix)
- Sagada (Soƛʼo)

The examples in this article are based on the Tsebari subdialect of Asakh. The Sagada dialect is notable for its divergence from the others, and is considered to be a separate language by some.

Hinukh and Khwarshi were also once regarded as dialects of the Tsez language but are now commonly viewed as distinct languages of the same family.

== Phonology ==
Each phoneme is listed with its IPA, Latin, and Cyrillic transcriptions.

=== Consonants ===
		Bilabial	Dental	Lateral Alveolar	Palatal	Velar	Uvular	Pharyngeal	Glottal
Stops	Voiceless	[p] p п ([pˤ])	[t] t т ([tʷ])			[k] k к ([kʷ] [kˤ])			
Stops	Voiced	[b] b б ([bˤ])	[d] d д ([dʷ])			[ɡ] g г ([gʷ] [gˤ])			
Stops	Ejective	[pʼ] pʼ пӀ ([pˤʼ])	[tʼ] tʼ тӀ ([tʷʼ])			[kʼ] kʼ кӀ ([kʷʼ] [kˤʼ])	[qʼ] qʼ къ ([qʷʼ] [qˤʼ])		
Affricates	Voiceless		[t͡s] c ц ([t͡sʷ])	[t͡ɬ] ƛ лӀ ([t͡ɬʷ])	[t͡ʃ] č ч ([t͡ʃʷ])		[q͡χ] q хъ ([q͡χʷ] [q͡χˤ])		
Affricates	Ejective		[t͡sʼ] cʼ цӀ ([t͡sʷʼ])	[t͡ɬʼ] ƛʼ кь ([t͡ɬʷʼ])	[t͡ʃʼ] čʼ чӀ ([t͡ʃʷʼ])				
Fricatives	Voiceless		[s] s с ([sʷ])	[ɬ] ł лъ ([ɬʷ])	[ʃ] š ш ([ʃʷ])		[χ] x х ([χʷ] [χˤ])	[ħ] ħ хӀ ([ħʷ])	[h] h гь ([hʷ] [hˤ])
Fricatives	Voiced		[z] z з ([zʷ])		[ʒ] ž ж ([ʒʷ])		[ʁ] ɣ гъ ([ʁʷ] [ʁˤ])	[ʕ] ʕ гӀ	
Nasals		[m] m м ([mˤ])	[n] n н						
Liquids			[r] r р	[l] l л					
Semivowels		[w] w в			[j] y й				

- Tsez shows an inventory of 33 consonants.
- The glottal stop ([ʔ]) is not phonemic but occurs automatically before non-pharyngealized vowels in word-initial position.
- Consonant clusters are often broken up by inserting the epenthetic vowel [e]. After [j], the inserted vowel is [i].
- Word-initial consonants can be pharyngealized and are marked as such in the proposed orthography by a small [ˤ] following the consonant; in the Cyrillic spelling a palochka ("Ӏ") is used after the vowel that follows the consonant.
  - A syllable-final pharyngealization of the consonant is transcribed in Cyrillic with Cʼ (where C stands for a consonant) and with VCˤ in the Latin transcription (the V stands for a vowel). Some dictionaries write this as VӀC though, which makes the sequence CVӀC ambiguous (see below).
  - A syllable-initial pharyngealization of the consonant is transcribed in Cyrillic with CVӀ (the palochka follows the vowel, since the pharyngealization actually affects it more than the preceding consonant) and with CˤV in the Latin transcription.
  - The pharyngealization itself is reported to be epiglottal.
- Labialized consonants are written as Cв in the Cyrillic and as Cʷ in the Latin transcription, respectively. Any consonant besides /n, l, j, ʕ/ and the bilabials can be labialized.

=== Vowels ===
	Front	Central	Back
High	[i] i и		[u] u у
Mid	[e̞] e е/э		[o̞] o о
Low		[a] a а ([aː] ā а̄)	

- The Tsebari dialect has only one long vowel ā.
- A vowel is dropped before another vowel, so there are never two consecutive vowels. However, a final -u labializes the preceding consonant, if followed by a vowel.
- Word-initial e is spelled э in Cyrillic.
- In the proposed Cyrillic orthography, ya, yo, yu can also be written as я, ё, ю.
- In the Asakh dialect, lengthened vowels are automatically neutralized to ā. Other dialects (e.g., Mokok) also have a low front vowel ([æ]), usually transcribed as ä in Latin and аь in Cyrillic, some also have a long mid back rounded vowel ([o]), transcribed as ō.

=== Phonotactics ===
The syllable structure is generally CV(C). There are no vowel clusters. It is an agglutinative language with a complex morphology. Suffixes are either C, V, CV, VC or C+CV (where the first consonant belongs to the preceding syllable), depending on the structure of the stem. An example is the superessive suffix -ƛʼ(o), which attached to the word besuro 'fish' forms besuro-ƛʼ 'on the fish' and together with is 'bull' forms is-ƛʼo in order to maintain the syllable restriction.

== Orthography ==
Tsez lacks a literary tradition and is poorly represented in written form. Avar and Russian are used as literary languages locally, even in schools. However, attempts have been made to develop a stable orthography for the Tsez language as well as its relatives, mainly for the purpose of recording traditional folklore; thus, a Cyrillic script based on that of Avar is often used. Fluency in Avar is usually higher among men than women, and the younger people tend to be more fluent in Russian than in Tsez, which is probably due to the lack of education in and about the language. Tsez is not taught in school and instead Avar is taught for the first five years and Russian afterwards.

In 1993, linguist Mikhail Alekseev devised the following orthography for Tsez. In 2023, the letter ГӀ гӀ was added.

А а	Ā ā	Б б	В в	Г г	Гъ гъ	Гь гь	Д д	Е е	Ё ё	Ж ж
З з	И и	Й й	К к	Къ къ	Кь кь	КӀ кӀ	Л л	Лъ лъ	ЛӀ лӀ	М м
Н н	О о	П п	ПӀ пӀ	Р р	С с	Т т	ТӀ тӀ	У у	Ф ф	Х х
Хъ хъ	ХӀ хӀ	Ц ц	ЦӀ цӀ	Ч ч	ЧӀ чӀ	Ш ш	Э э	Ю ю	Я я	'

== Morphology ==
Tsez grammar was first analyzed by the Georgian linguist Davit Imnaishvili in 1963. Currently, a collection of Tsez folklore texts (written in the Mokok dialect) is in production.

=== Nouns ===
Nouns are inflected for number and case, and have noun classes assigned to them.

==== Number ====
Nouns can either be singular or plural. The plural is formed by adding -bi to the stem in the absolutive case: besuro 'fish sg.' → besuro-bi 'fish pl.'. For all other cases, the suffix is -za; thus, "of the fish [pl.]" becomes besuro-za-s.

==== Case ====
There are eight syntactical and a much larger number of locative cases, which distinguish three categories: location, orientation, and direction. Thus, counting the both locative and non-locative cases, there are 64 cases.

Tsez is an ergative–absolutive language, which means that it makes no distinction between the subject of an intransitive sentence and the object of a transitive one. Both are in the unmarked absolutive case; the agent of the transitive sentence is in the ergative case.

According to Ramazan Rajabov, the oblique stem of 42% of the nouns is different from the absolutive stem. Some nouns change their internal structure (such as a vowel), but others add one of about 20 so-called "thematic suffixes" to their end, to which the other case suffixes are attached. For example, the word for "language" or "tongue" is mec, but its oblique stem is mecre-, hence its plural is mecrebi, the ergative mecrā and so on. Rajabov says that the choice of the correct thematic suffix is sometimes difficult even for native speakers. It is likely that their origin lies in an application of two different plural forms, similar to the way the English word "children" actually has two archaic plural endings: -(e)r and -en. In Tsez it is sometimes even possible to use both the archaic and the regular and more productive -bi plural for a word.

===== Syntactic case suffixes =====
	Singular	Plural
Absolutive	-∅	-bi
Ergative	-ā	-z-ā
Genitive 1	-(e)s	-za-s
Genitive 2	-(e)z	-za-z
Dative	-(e)r	-za-r
Instrumental	-(e)d	-za-d
Equative 1	-ce	-za-ce
Equative 2	-qʼāy	-za-qʼāy

Of the two genitive cases, the first is used as attribute to an absolutive head noun and the second to an oblique one. That means, that the Genitive 1 is used for phrases like žekʼu-s is 'the man's bull', and the Genitive 2 is used for žekʼu-z is-er 'for the man's bull'.

The Equative 1 is used to make comparisons, like besuro-ce 'like a fish' and can also be attached to other cases.

Rajabov suggests 3 more syntactical cases, namely possessive 1 (-łay), possessive 2 (-xu) and abessive (-tay). However, their status is debatable, as they seem to show both inflectional as well as derivational tendencies.

===== Locative case suffixes =====
	Essive	Lative	Ablative	Allative^{1}	meaning
In—	-ā -āz	-ā-r -āz-a-r	-āy -āz-ay	-āɣor -āz-a	= in (a hollow object)
Cont—	-ł -ł-āz	-ł-er -ł-āz-a-r	-ł-āy -ł-āz-ay	-ł-xor -ł-āz-a	= in (a mass), among
Super—	-ƛʼ(o) -ƛʼ-āz	-ƛʼo-r -ƛʼ-āz-a-r	-ƛʼ-āy -ƛʼ-āz-ay	-ƛʼ-āɣor, -ƛʼ-ār -ƛʼ-āz-a	= on (horizontal)
Sub—	-ƛ -ƛ-āz	-ƛ-er -ƛ-āz-a-r	-ƛ-āy -ƛ-āz-ay	-ƛ-xor -ƛ-āz-a	= under
Ad—	-x(o) -x-āz	-xo-r -x-āz-a-r	-x-āy -x-āz-ay	-x-āɣor, -x-ā-r -x-āz-a	= at
Apud—	-de -d-āz	-de-r -d-āz-a-r	-d-āy -d-āz-ay	-d-āɣor, -d-ā-r -d-āz-a	= near
Post—	-q(o) -q-āz	-qo-r -q-āz-a-r	-q-āy -q-āz-ay	-q-āɣor, -q-ā-r -q-āz-a	= on (vertical)
meaning	= at (position)	= to (destination)	= from (origin)	= towards (direction)	

1. The allative case is also called 'versative'. In the distal paradigm, it is used in the sense of "behind" or "beyond" and is then called 'posterior'.

Of the forms, the upper one shows the non-distal (i.e., close), the lower one the distal (i.e., far) form of the suffix. In the non-distal there are sometimes two equal forms for the allative case. The epenthetic vowel o in parentheses is used after noun stems ending in a consonant; thus, "next to the bull" is is-xo, while "next to the fish" is besuro-x.

==== Noun classes ====
Tsez distinguishes four noun classes in the singular and two in the plural. They are prefixes that are attached to verbs, adjectives, adverbs, several postpositions like -oƛƛʼo 'between' or -iłe 'like' and the emphatic particle -uy to show agreement with the noun. Agreement is only possible on vowel-initial words or words that begin with a pharyngealized vowel, but there are also a few words beginning with a vowel that do not take these prefixes.

Class	Singular	Plural	Attribution
I	∅-	b-	for male people only
II	y-	r-	for female people and inanimate objects (e.g., "book")
III	b-	r-	for animals and inanimate objects (e.g., "sun")
IV	r-	r-	for inanimate objects only (e.g., "water")

As inanimate objects cover the classes II, III and IV, it's not transparent into which class an inanimate object belongs. However, there are certain tendencies based on the semantic field of the nouns. Nouns that are able to move (like sun, moon, star, lightning, car, train) usually belong to class III, while products that traditionally have to do with the work of women (like clothes or berries and also milk) often belong to class II. Clothes made from leather are—as the word for leather itself—usually assigned to class III, due to their relation to animals.

Class IV originally included abstract words, collective and mass nouns, such as water, salt, sky or wind. Materials also often seem to trigger noun classes: "chair" and "wood" are both class IV nouns. Also shape seems to have an influence (flat things are associated with class II, round things with class III and long things with class IV). In the same manner, proper names are assigned the classes of the nouns they denote. Thus, Patʼi 'Fatima' is assigned class II, as it is a female name, and Asaq (a Tsez village) belongs to class III, because "village" (ʕaƛʼ) is also in this group. Likewise, new loan words are assigned the noun class of a semantically similar existing Tsez word.

Experiments have shown that Tsez speakers do not assign any noun classes to new words for objects or places with which they are unfamiliar.

Certain derivational endings also require a specific noun class, see the section about derivation below.

Verbs and adverbs always agree with the absolutive argument of the phrase, regardless of the clause's transitivity. If more than one absolutive argument is linked by the conjunction -n(o) 'and' and one of them is of the first noun class, then class I plural triggers the agreement for the clause; otherwise, it is class II/III/IV plural. Compare:

kid-no uži-n b-ay-si
girl[II]:ABS-and boy[I]:ABS-and IPL-come-PSTWIT
"A girl and a boy arrived."

and

kid-no meši-n r-ay-si
girl[II]:ABS-and calf[III]:ABS-and IIPL-come-PSTWIT
"A girl and a calf arrived."

=== Pronouns ===
==== Personal pronouns ====
Personal pronouns exist in Tsez only for the first and second person; for the third person the demonstratives že (singular) and žedi (plural) are used. As the singular personal pronouns have the same form in absolutive and ergative, a sentence like Di mi okʼsi is ambiguous, because it can both mean "I hit you" and "You hit me", due to the rather free word order. However, they have a different form for the oblique cases and an irregular form in the genitive 1 case, the same as the plural pronouns. The singular pronouns also have the same forms for all four noun classes, while the plurals make this distinction, as shown in the chart below.

		class I	class II-IV
1st person singular	abs. & erg.	di	
1st person singular	oblique	dā-	
1st person singular	genitive 1	dey	
2nd person singular	abs. & erg	mi	
2nd person singular	oblique	debe-^{1} dow-^{2}	
2nd person singular	genitive 1	debi	
1st person plural	absolutive	eli	ela
1st person plural	oblique	elu-	ela-
1st person plural	special gen. 1^{3}	eli	
1st person plural	special gen. 2^{3}	eliz	
2nd person plural	absolutive	meži	meža
2nd person plural	oblique	mežu-	meža-
2nd person plural	special gen. 1^{3}	meži	
2nd person plural	special gen. 2^{3}	mežiz	

1. This form is used before a syllable-final consonant, such as the suffix -r.
2. This form is used before a syllable-initial consonant, such as the suffix -de.
3. The special forms of the two genitives is used when the possessor is a close group, typically a family, thus eli eniy is used for "our mother" instead of elus eniy. The plural demonstrative žedi 'they' also shows this feature, being žedi in the close group genitive 1 and žediz in the close group genitive 2. For ordinary possessors these forms would be žedus and žeduz, respectively.
- There is also a reflexive personal pronoun, meaning "self" or "oneself", which is žo and ne- in its oblique form, respectively.

==== Demonstrative pronouns ====
Demonstrative pronouns are suffixes that are attached to the corresponding noun. They inflect for noun classes, number and case and make a two-way distinction into proximal (close, English: "this/these") and distal (far, English: "that/those"), the latter of which are also used as third person pronouns.

The oblique forms are used attributively and also as a base to which other (oblique) case suffixes can be attached.

		Singular		Plural	
		Class I	Class II-IV	Class I	Class II-IV
Proximal	Absolutive	-da	-du	-ziri	
Proximal	Oblique	-si	-ła-, -ł^{1}	-zi	-za
Distal	Absolutive	že		žedi	
Distal	Oblique	nesi	neło, neł^{1}	žedu	žeda

1. The -ł forms are used optionally after vowels at the end of words.

==== Interrogative pronouns ====
Interrogative pronouns make a distinction between human ("who?") and non-human ("what?") only in the oblique forms, but not in the absolutive. The non-human interrogative pronouns require the class IV affix when triggering agreement.

Interrogative pronouns that are replacing an adjunct (as, for instance, "when?" or "why?") usually occur at the beginning of the sentence, while those replacing arguments ("who?", "what?", etc.) often stay in the position of the replaced word. However, they can be fronted as well for the purpose of discourse-specific linking. Thus, a fronted šebi might be translated as "Which...?" instead of "What...?".

	Human	Non-human
Absolutive	šebi	
Oblique	łā	łina
Ergative	łu	łinā

Other interrogative pronouns include:

- dice 'how much?'
- didiyu 'which?'
- didur 'how?'
- łina-s 'why?' (this seems to be the genitive 1 form of the non-human oblique interrogative pronoun)
- nā 'where?', stem na-
- neti 'when?'
- šidā 'why?'
- šomo 'how many?'

=== Verbs ===
Tsez has a rich verbal morphology with many categories. Despite the great variety in conjugation, the only truly irregular verb is "to be" with some forms being yoł (present), ānu (present negative), zow- (past), etc. There are 4 morphological groups, according to the final phoneme of the stem: The first group ends in a consonant, the second in i, the third in -u and the fourth group contains the verbs with the variable ending -d (before a vowel) / -y (elsewhere).

==== Tense-aspect-mood ====
There are five tense forms in the indicative mood, shown in the following table with examples for verbs with vocalic and consonantal stem endings. The past forms make an evidentiality distinction.

Form	Suffix	With -iš- ("to eat")	With -esu- ("to find")
past unwitnessed	-n(o)	-iš-no "ate"	-esu-n "found"
past witnessed	-s(i)	-iš-si "ate"	-esu-s "found"
present	-x(o)	-iš-xo "eat"	-esu-x "find"
future definite	-an	-iš-an "will eat"	-esʷ-an "will find"
future indefinite	shift of the vowel in the stem before the last consonant to ā	-āš "will eat"	-āsu "will find"

- In interrogative sentences (English "wh-questions"), the past witnessed suffix is -ā instead of -s(i). In yes–no questions, the finite verb receives the additional ending -ā, except for the past witnessed form, which receives the ending -iyā (after consonants) or -yā (after vowels).
- Of the two different future tenses, the definite one bears the connotation of being wanted by the speaker ("I want and I will...") and is only used with the first person, while the indefinite one (simply "will") tends to be used with second and third.
- Other moods are formed as follows:
  - The imperative has no suffix for intransitive verbs (e.g., -ikʼi! 'go!' and the suffix -o for transitive verbs (e.g., tʼetʼr-o! 'read!'; the verb is usually put in the first position in the phrase then.
  - The optative adds a -ƛ to the imperative form, e.g., tʼetʼr-o-ƛ! 'let him read!'.
- There is also a great variety of analytical forms for verbs often exhibiting aspectual meaning:
  - emphatic future = infinitive + "to be" (present tense); e.g., -ikʼ-a yoł 'shall go'
  - continuous aspect = imperfect gerund + "to be" (in its appropriate tense-aspect form); e.g., -ikʼi-x zow-si 'was going'
  - perfective aspect = perfect gerund + "to be"; e.g., -ikʼi-n zow-si 'had gone'
  - perfect = resultative participle + "to be"; e.g., -ikʼ-āsi zow-si 'had gone'
  - intentive = present participle + "to be"; e.g., -ikʼi-xo-si zow-si 'intended to go'
  - resultative = imperfective/perfective gerund + resultative participle of -iči- 'be located' + "to be"; e.g., -ikʼi-n -ič-ā-si zow-si 'was gone' or -ikʼi-x -ič-ā-si zow-si 'was in the state of being on his way hence'

==== Negation ====
The basic negation suffix in the indicative is -čʼV with V being a vowel that can be different, depending on the tense/aspect/mood of the verb; it is inserted after the verb stem. With the example verb -ikʼi- 'to go', the following forms are possible:

Form	Negation Suffix	With -ikʼi- ("to go")
past unwitnessed negative	-čʼey-	-ikʼi-čʼey "didn't go"
past witnessed negative	-čʼu-	-ikʼi-čʼu-s or -ikʼi-čʼu "didn't go"
present negative	-ānu- (present negative of "to be")	-ikʼi-x-ānu "doesn't go"
future definite negative	-čʼi-	-ikʼ-ā-čʼi-n "won't go"
future indefinite negative	-čʼi-	-ākʼi-čʼi "won't go" (vowel shift!)

- The prohibitive (i.e. the negative imperative) is expressed by adding the suffix -no to the future indefinite form of the verb, e.g., -āš-no! 'don't eat!'.
- The negative optative form simply adds a -ƛ to that: āš-no-ƛ 'let him not eat!'.

==== Non-finite forms ====
Participles behave like adjectives and only vary according to the class agreement, which gets attached to them as prefixes. There are several different kinds of participles in the Tsez language:

Form	Suffix	With -iš- ("to eat")
past participle	-ru (stem vowel → ā)^{1}	-āš-ru "having eaten"
past negative participle	-čʼi-ru (stem vowel → ā)^{1}	-āš-čʼi-ru "not having eaten"
resultative participle	-ā-si	-iš-ā-si "in the state of having eaten"
resultative negative participle	-ani	-iš-ani "in the state of not having eaten"
present participle	-xo-si	-iš-xo-si "eating"
present negative participle	-x-ānu-si	-iš-x-ānu-si "not eating"

1. The stem vowel here is the vowel before the last consonant. Note that stems, different from roots, include causatives; thus -ikʼi- 'to go' becomes -ākʼi-, but its causative form -ikʼir- 'to let go' becomes -ikʼār-! Sometimes also unarticulated epenthetic vowels can be lengthened to ā, as in: tʼetʼr- 'to learn', which becomes tʼetʼār-.

Converbs, like gerunds and verbal adverbs, are very numerous in Tsez. The following list gives only an incomplete account. The table illustrates the relationship between the temporal converb (C) and the main verb (V):

Relationship between C and V		Suffix	With -ikʼi- ("to go")
C and V are simultaneous	manner of action	-x	-ikʼi-x
C and V are simultaneous	punctual	-ƛʼ	-ikʼi-ƛʼ
C and V are simultaneous	simple simultaneous	-ƛʼorey / -zey	-ikʼi-ƛʼorey / -ikʼi-zey "while he goes/went"
C precedes V	manner of action	-n	-ikʼi-n
C precedes V	simple anterior	-nosi	-ikʼi-nosi "after he goes/went"
C precedes V	immediate anterior	-run (stem vowel → ā)^{1}	-ākʼi-run "immediately after he goes/went"
C follows V	simple posterior	-zaƛʼor	-ikʼi-zaƛʼor "before he goes/went"
C follows V	terminative	-a-ce	-ikʼ-a-ce "until he goes/went"

- Other non-temporal converbs are:
  - perfective (completive) and imperfective (durative) converbs are identical to the past unwitnessed and present forms respectively: -n(o) and -x(o)
  - locative converb: -z-ā, stem vowel changes to ā
  - causal converb: -xoy, -za-ƛʼ or -za-q; e.g., -iš-xoy 'because of eating'
  - conditional converb: -nāy or -łi; e.g., iš-nāy 'if he eats'
  - concessive converb: -łin
- infinitive: -a; e.g., -iš-a 'to eat'
- verbal noun: -(a)ni; e.g., -iš-ani 'the eating' and -rečʼ-ni 'the cutting'

==== Potential and causative ====
The potential mood receives the suffix -(e)ł, while the causative mood suffix is -(e)r. Again, the epenthetic vowel is dropped when the stem ends in a vowel or if another suffix starting with a vowel is attached. Together with the definite future suffixes -an, for instance, the epenthetic vowel has to be dropped: iš-er 'let him eat', but iš-r-an 'will let him eat'.

=== Particles ===
Tsez has a rich set of particles, most of them occurring as clitics. The particle -tow shows general emphasis while -kin shows general emphasis and focusing. A contrastively topicalized constituent is marked by the particle -gon. Being clitics, they can be attached to any part of speech. There is also a quotation particle that is used in direct reported speech and appears as the suffix -ƛin that always appears at the end of the quoted phrase or sentence. Example: Di žekʼu yołƛin eƛix kʼetʼā '"I am a man," says the cat'. There are also other free particles like hudu 'yes, so' or āy 'no'.

=== Word formation ===
==== Derivation ====
===== Noun-forming suffixes =====
The following list is a selection of suffixes used to form nouns from other parts of speech as well as other nouns.

- -bi / -zi (added to place names): residents
  e.g., Newo-bi / Newo-zi 'resident of Mokok' from Newo 'Mokok'
- -łi (added to singular absolutive nouns denoting persons or to adjectives in the class IV form): abstract nouns and occupations
  e.g., laɣ-łi ('slavery', from laɣ 'slave'), učitel-łi ('teaching', from the Russian loan učitel 'teacher'), r-igu-łi ('grace, kindness', from -igu 'good')
- -kʼu (added to verbs in the iterative stem forms): instruments or personal descriptions
  e.g., ˤuƛʼno-kʼu ('coward', from ˤuƛʼ-, 'to be afraid'), ˤiya-kʼu ('cryer', from ˤiyad-, 'to cry')
- -ni (added to verb stems and onomatopoeic nouns): abstract nouns
  e.g., rečʼ-ni ('sharpness', from rečʼ- 'to cut'), ˤoy-ni ('mooing', from ˤoy 'moo')
- -qu (added to nouns in their oblique stem) or the lesser used Awar suffix -qan: container or occupation
  e.g., magala-qu 'baker', bocʼ-a-qu 'wolf-trap', qido-qan 'mason'
- -qʼoy / -qoy / -ħoy (added to singular oblique noun stems): enveloping objects
  e.g., reƛʼi-qoy 'glove', from reƛʼa 'hand'
- -yo (added to the lative singular of a noun): possessor
  e.g., kotʼu-r-yo 'bearded man', from kotʼu 'beard'

===== Adjective-forming suffixes =====
The following suffixes can be used to derive adjectives from other words:

- -mu (added to singular absolutive noun, adjectives or verbs): simple adjective
  e.g., boryo-mu 'sickly', from boryo 'sore, wound', atʼi-mu 'unripe', from atʼiy 'wet', šakarya-mu 'jealous', from šakaryad- 'to be jealous'
- -šay (added to oblique noun stems): inseparable possessing
  e.g., čakaryo-šay čay 'sweet tea', literally 'sugar-containing tea'
- -tay (added to oblique noun stems): absence, lacking
  e.g., ciyo-tay 'unsalted'
- -xu (added to oblique noun stems): separable possessing
  e.g., ciyo-xu raƛʼ 'soil with salt crystals'

===== Verb-forming suffixes =====
Some verb-forming suffixes, like the causative and potential derivatives, have already been mentioned in the section about the verbal morphology. Other examples include:

- -kʼ- (added to qualitative adjectives, adverbs and some intransitive verbs ending in -x): transitive verbs
  e.g., atʼi-kʼ- 'to dampen, to soak', from atʼiy 'wet'; bito-kʼ- 'to move sth.', from bittay 'over there'; łicʼo-kʼ- 'to unite', from łicʼox- 'to mix'
- -ł- (added to qualitative adjectives and adverbs): intransitive verbs
  e.g., atʼi-ł- 'to become wet', from atʼiy 'wet'; ade-x- 'to move forward', from adāy 'in front'

==== Compounding and reduplication ====
In Tsez it is also possible to create new words from combining existing ones; usually nouns and verbs are derived, but there also exist compound adjectives and adverbs. Only the last component of the compound inflects, as it is the head of the phrase. However, it does not necessarily govern the noun class assignment for compound nouns—if one of the two components belongs to class I, then the whole compound is of this class, otherwise it is automatically assigned to noun class II. Sometimes, the last component is truncated (see fifth example). Suffixation may also occur (see first example). The following list is not exhaustive:

- debi-dey-łi 'quarrel, dividing up' (lit. 'your-my' + nominalizer -łi)
- eni-obiy or eni-obu 'parents' (lit. 'mother-father')
- ħotʼo-čʼel 'stirrup' (lit. 'foot-place')
- -ikʼi-nex- 'to go back and forth' (lit. 'go-come')
- ƛʼiri-ku 'shawl' (lit. ƛʼiri 'above' - kur 'throw')
- niga-cʼuda 'bruised' (lit. 'red-green')
- rigu-žuka 'anything' (lit. 'good-bad')
- taqqo-naqqo 'back and forth' (lit. 'on that side - on this side')
- tʼitʼi-ečʼ- 'hash' (lit. 'tear-cut up')

Another common way to derive new words is reduplication, which can derive nouns, as well as adjectives and verbs. In reduplicating nouns, the initial syllable can often undergo a change, as in xisi-basi 'changes' or bix-mix 'herbs'. It is used to intensify adjectives (e.g., r-očʼi-r-očʼiy 'very cold') and verbs (e.g., -okʼ-okʼ- 'to stab repeatedly') but is also used for onomatopoeia (e.g., ħi-ħi 'neigh').

Another highly productive way of forming verbs is the combination of a word (often a loan from Arabic or Avar) and the Tsez verbs -oq- ('to stay, to become') or -od- ('to do'), although some combinations can also be formed with other verbs. Note that only the second word is inflected, while the first one remains uninflected. Some examples are:

- bercin -oq- 'to be decorated' from Avar берцинав (bercinaw 'beautiful')
- paradat -od- 'to sell' from Russian продать (prodat’ 'to sell')
- razwod b-od- 'to divorce' from Russian развод (razvod 'divorce')
- riƛu riƛʼ- 'to plough' (lit. 'ploughing-field plough')
- rokʼ-ƛʼo-r r-ay- 'to remember' (lit. 'heart-SUPER-LAT III-arrive')
- rokʼu r-exu- 'to feel pity' lit. 'heart die'
- sapu y-od- 'to destroy'
- tʼamizi -od- 'to cause' from Avar тIамизе (tʼamize 'to force')
- woržizi -oq- 'to fly' from Avar -оржизе (-oržize 'to fly')
- xabar b-od- 'to talk' from Arabic خبر (xabar 'news, message') via Avar хабар (xabar 'story')

== Syntax ==
=== Noun phrase ===
Noun phrases (NP) per definition have a nominal head, which can be a noun, a pronoun or a substantivized expression such as a participle with the nominalizer -łi, verbal nouns (masdars) or substantivized restrictive adjectives (as in English: "the older one")—the latter one bears the suffix -ni directly after the adjective stem. They all inflect for case.

As Tsez is a head-last language, all modifiers precede the head noun and agree with it in class. The neutral order of modifiers is usually:

1. relative clause
2. unemphatic possessive pronoun
3. emphatic possessive pronoun
4. restrictive adjective
5. demonstrative
6. numeral / quantifier
7. non-restrictive adjective

Note that the order of element number 4, 5 and 6 may vary:

sideni ʕaƛ-ā b-iči-xosi nesi-s b-aqʼˤu žuka-tʼa-ni ʕagarłi
another village-IN:ESS IPL-be-PRSPRT he-GEN1 IPL-many bad-DISTR-RESTR relative
"his many unpleasant relatives who live in the next village"

Modifiers can also include oblique noun phrases, which then take one of the two genitive suffixes depending on the case of the head noun: -si for absolutive, -zo for oblique head nouns. Compare:

ħon-ƛʼo-si ʕadala
'the fool on the hill', absolutive

and

ħon-ƛʼo-zo ʕadala-r
'to the fool on the hill', dative/lative

=== Verb phrase ===
Verb phrases (VP) are phrases whose head is a verb or a copula. Verbs can have different transitivities that directly affect the case distribution for their nominal arguments.

==== Copulas ====
Copulas are used in the Tsez language to combine the subject with a noun phrase or with predicative adjectives and can in these cases be translated with the English copula "to be". The subject as well as the predicative noun stands in the absolutive case and is thus unmarked. If an environmental condition is described in form of an adjective, the adjective requires class IV agreement. Compare the following examples:

ʕAli-s obiy aħo yoł
Ali-GEN1 father shepherd be:PRS
"Ali's father is a shepherd."

and

ciq-qo r-očʼiy zow-si
forest-POSS:ESS IV-cold be-PSTWIT
"It was cold in the forest."

==== Intransitive verbs ====
The only argument of intransitive verbs stands in the unmarked absolutive case. The verb agrees with the noun in class.

An example phrase would be: is b-exu-s 'the bull died'

==== Monotransitive verbs ====
Monotransitive verbs are verbs that take two arguments. As Tsez is an absolutive–ergative language, the subject, or—to be more precise—the agent, requires the ergative case, while the direct object (or patient) requires the absolutive case. The direct object of a transitive verb is thus marked in the same way as the subject of an intransitive verb. Again, the verb agrees in class with the absolutive (i.e. the direct object).

žekʼ-ā gulu b-okʼ-si
man-ERG horse:ABS III-hit-PSTWIT
"The man hit the horse."

Both arguments, the agent as well as the patient, can be omitted if they are clear from the context.

==== Ditransitive verbs ====
Ditransitive verbs are verbs that require 3 arguments: a subject (or agent), a direct object (or patient, sometimes also called theme) and an indirect object (or recipient). In English "to give" and "to lend" are typical ditransitive verbs. In Tsez the agent takes the ergative and the patient takes the absolutive case. The recipient's case depends on the semantic nature of the transfer of possession or information: if it's a permanent transfer (e.g., "to give (as a present)"), the recipient takes the dative/lative case (ending in -(e)r), if it's a non-permanent transfer (e.g., "to lend") or if it's incomplete, the recipient takes any of the locative cases. Two examples illustrate the difference:

Permanent transfer:

ʕAl-ā kidbe-r surat teƛ-si
Ali-ERG girl-DAT picture:ABS give-PSTWIT
"Ali gave the girl a picture (for good, e.g., as a gift)."

Temporary transfer:

ʕAl-ā kidbe-qo-r surat teƛ-si
Ali-ERG girl-POSS-DAT picture:ABS give-PSTWIT
"Ali lent the girl a picture."

==== Affective clauses ====
Affective clauses have either verbs of perception or psychological verbs as predicate. Those verbs are for example: "be bored/bother", "become known", "find", "forget", "hate", "hear", "know", "love/like", "miss", "see", etc. The experiencer (which would be the subject in the corresponding English sentence) is usually in the dative case, while the stimulus (the object in the English sentence) takes the absolutive case.

ʕAli-r Patʼi y-eti-x
Ali-DAT Fatima:ABS II-love-PRS
"Ali loves Fatima."

==== Potential clauses ====
Potential clauses are the equivalent to English clauses involving the words "can" or "be able to". In Tsez this is expressed by the verbal suffix -ł; the subject of the clause then takes the possessive case (-q(o)) instead of the ergative, while the object of the verb is in the absolutive.

kʼetʼu-q ɣˤay ħaƛu-ł-xo
cat-POSS:ESS milk:ABS drink-POT-PRS
"The cat can drink milk."

==== Causativization ====
Causative constructions ("to make/let someone do something") are formed by the causative suffix -r. It increases the valency of any verb by 1. If a ditransitive verb is formed from a transitive one, the causee (i.e. the argument that is subject and object at the same time) appears in the possessive case (-q(o)); see the example below (the e before the causative suffix is an epenthetic vowel):

aħ-ā čanaqan-qo zey žekʼ-er-si
shepherd-ERG hunter-POSS:ESS bear:ABS hit-CAUS-PSTWIT
"The shepherd made the hunter hit the bear."

=== Word order ===
Tsez is a head-final language, which means that – apart from postpositions – modifiers like relative clauses, adjectives, genitives and numerals always precede the main clauses. The neutral order in clauses with more than one modifier is:

Agent/Experiencer—Recipient—Patient—Locative—Instrument

The order can be changed to emphasize single noun phrases.

Although in general, the underlying word order is SOV (subject–object–verb), the predicate tends to be in the middle of the sentence rather than at the end of it. This word order seems to become increasingly common in daily speech. For narrative use, a VSO word order is sometimes used as well.

=== Interrogative sentences ===
The interrogative suffix -ā (-yā after vowels) is used to mark yes/no-questions. It is added to the word focused by the question:

kʼetʼu ɣˤutk-ā yoł-ā?
cat:ABS house-IN:ESS be:PRS-INT
"Is the cat in the house?"

kʼetʼu-yā ɣˤutk-ā yoł?
cat:ABS-INT house-IN:ESS be:PRS
"Is it the cat that is in the house?"

kʼetʼu ɣˤutk-ā-yā yoł?
cat:ABS house-IN:ESS-INT be:PRS
"Is it the house that the cat is in?"

=== Negation ===
The negative particle ānu follows the negated constituent; if the entire sentence is to be negated, verb suffixes are used (see above in the section about the verb morphology).

For the imperative, prohibitive and optative form, see the same section on verb morphology above.

=== Coordination ===
Coordination of clauses (as in English with the conjunction "and") is rare in the Tsez language. Noun phrases are coordinated by adding the suffix -n (after vowels) or -no (after consonants) to all items of the enumeration, thus "the hen and the rooster" is onuču-n mamalay-no. In conditional sentences the conjunction "then" may be expressed by the word yołi:

tatanu ɣudi r-oq-si yołi eli ker-āɣor esanad-a b-ikʼ-a zow-si
warm day:ABS IV-become-PSTWIT COND 1PL:ABS river-IN:ALL bathe-INF IPL-go-INF be-PSTWIT
"If the day had become warm, (then) we would have gone to bathe in the river."

=== Subordination ===
==== Relative clauses ====
Any argument or adjunct of a sentence can be made the head of a relative clause, even indirect objects and adverbials. The predicate of such a clause is always a participle and the relative construction precedes the head noun. Constituents can also be taken from embedded clauses. However, it is not possible to raise the possessor in a possessive phrase to the head position of a relative construction.

The following examples show how different arguments (examples 2, 3 and 4) and an adverbial adjunct (example 5) are relativized from the underlying sentence in example 1:

Example 1 (standard):

už-ā kidb-er gagali teƛ-si/teƛ-xo
boy-ERG girl-DAT flower:ABS give-PSTWIT/give-PRS
"The boy gave/gives a flower to the girl."

Example 2 (relativized agent):

kidb-er gagali tāƛ-ru/teƛ-xosi uži
girl-DAT flower:ABS give-PSTPRT/give-PRSPRT boy:ABS
"the boy who gave/gives a flower to the girl"

Example 3 (relativized patient):

už-ā kidb-er tāƛ-ru/teƛ-xosi gagali
boy-ERG girl-DAT give-PSTPRT/give-PRSPRT flower:ABS
"the flower that the boy gave/gives to the girl"

Example 4 (relativized recipient):

už-ā gagali tāƛ-ru/teƛ-xosi kid
boy-ERG flower:ABS give-PSTPRT/give-PRSPRT girl:ABS
"the girl to whom the boy gave/gives the flowers"

Example 5 (relativized adjunct):

už-ā kidb-er gagali tāƛ-ru/teƛ-xosi ɣudi
boy-ERG girl-DAT flower:ABS give-PSTPRT/give-PRSPRT day:ABS
"the day on which the boy gave/gives the flowers to the girl"

==== Adverbial clauses ====
There are several different kinds of adverbial clauses.

Temporal adverbial clauses describe a chronological sequence of two actions, as in English "Before it started to rain, we were home" or "We talked, while we were going." In Tsez this relation is marked by verbal suffixes that turn one verb into a converb. See the table for converb suffixes in the "Non-finite forms" part of the verb morphology section.

Local adverbial clauses use locative converbs, which are also formed by adding a suffix to the verb. This suffix is -z-ā- and the vowel before the last consonant of the verb itself is lengthened to ā. This converb forms the head of the local phrase and can thus receive a locative suffix that is normally used on nouns.

Causal adverbial clauses, which in English are usually expressed using "because", "as", "when", "since" or "that", receive the converb suffix -xoy, -za-ƛʼ or -za-q.

There are more kinds of adverbial clauses, see the part "Non-finite forms" in the verb morphology section for more example suffixes.

==== Infinitival clauses ====
Modal verbs, phrasal verbs, verbs of motion and psychological verbs can all be accompanied by an infinitive verb. Verbal nouns or "masdars" (formed by the suffix -(a)ni) can be used instead of infinitive verbs; they express purpose more strongly. Those verbal nouns also occur with psychological verbs like "be afraid of" and then usually take the possessive case (ending -q).

==== Completement clauses ====
When a clause is used in place of a noun, as in "The father knew [that the boy wanted bread].", the optional nominalizing suffix -łi can be attached to the predicate of the embedded clause. The clause belongs to noun class IV, then:

obi-r [uži-r magalu b-āti-ru-łi] r-iy-si
father-DAT [boy-DAT bread:ABS III-want-PSTPRT-NMLZ] IV-know-PSTWIT
"The father knew [that the boy wanted bread]."

==== Reported speech ====
If a speech act verb like "say", "ask", "shout" introduces reported speech, the reported utterance is followed by the clitical quotation particle ƛin, which is suffixed to verbs and stands alone in all other cases. It is remarkable that the point of view and the tense of the original utterance is maintained, hence the only difference between direct and indirect speech is the particle ƛin. See this example:

ʕAl-ā dā-q quno ocʼcʼino qʼˤano ƛeb yoł-ƛin eƛi-s
Ali-ERG 1SG-POSS:ESS twenty ten two year:ABS be:PRS-QUOT say-PSTWIT
"Ali said that he was 32 years old."

== Lexicon ==
The vocabulary shows many traces of influences of Avar, Georgian, Arabic, and Russian, mainly through loanwords and, in the case of Russian, even in grammar and style. There are also loanwords of Turkic origin. These factors may eventually lead to the decline of use of the Tsez language, as it is more and more replaced by Avar and Russian, partly due to loss of traditional culture among the people and the adoption of Western clothing, technology and architecture.

=== Numerals ===
Numerals come in two different forms: in the absolutive case and as an oblique stem (always ending in -a) to which other case endings are attached when the numerals are used nonattributively. The oblique form is also used when it refers to a non-absolutive noun, as in sida ˤaƛār 'to one/a village'. When counting objects, the counted objects always stay in the singular form.

	Absolutive	Oblique
1	sis	sida
2	qʼˤano	qʼˤuna
3	łˤono	łˤora
4	uyno	uyra
5	łeno	łera
6	iłno	iłłira
7	ʕoƛno	ʕoƛƛora
8	biƛno	biƛƛira
9	očʼčʼino	očʼčʼira
10	ocʼcʼino	ocʼcʼira
11	ocʼcʼino sis / siyocʼi	ocʼcʼira sida
12	ocʼcʼino qʼˤano / qʼˤayocʼi	ocʼcʼira qʼˤuna
13	ocʼcʼino łˤono / łˤoyocʼi	ocʼcʼira łˤora
14	ocʼcʼino uyno / uwocʼi	ocʼcʼira uyra
15	ocʼcʼino łeno / łewocʼi	ocʼcʼira łera
16	ocʼcʼino iłno / iłocʼi	ocʼcʼira iłłira
17	ocʼcʼino ʕoƛno / ʕoƛocʼi	ocʼcʼira ʕoƛƛora
18	ocʼcʼino biƛno / biƛocʼi	ocʼcʼira biƛƛira
19	ocʼcʼino očʼčʼino / ečʼocʼi	ocʼcʼira očʼčʼira
20	quno	qura
100	bišon	bišonra
1,000	ʕazar	ʕazarra

- There are two ways of forming the numbers 11 through 19, but only the first way also exists in oblique form. The second form with the suffix -ocʼi cannot be declined.
- Above 20, numbers are formed on the basis of multiples of 20: qʼˤanoqu (40), łˤonoqu (60) and uynoqu (80). For the oblique forms, the suffix -ra is added for all items.
- The numeral for 100 has an alternative form bišom used before the suffix -no in compound numerals.
- The numeral for 1000, ʕazar, seems to be a loan from Persian هزار (hezār 'thousand'), probably via Avar.
- Higher hundreds and thousands are expressed simply by juxtaposition, the multiplier preceding the larger number.
- Compound numerals are formed by attaching the suffix -no 'and' to the higher number and placing the lower one right after it. For example, 47 would be qʼˤanoquno ʕoƛno in Tsez. A number like 72 would be expressed as "sixty-twelve": łˤonoquno qʼˤayocʼi or łˤonoquno ocʼcʼino qʼˤano.

Cardinal numbers (as in English "one, two, three") precede the nouns, which then do not stand in their plural forms but in the singular instead; e.g.: uyno is 'four oxen'.
Ordinal numbers (as in English "first, second, third") are constructed by combining the cardinal numbers with the word āƛiru. Hence, qʼˤano āƛiru ɣudi means 'the second day'.
Adverbial numbers (as in English "once, twice, thrice") are constructed by replacing the suffix -no by -x, thus "twice" becomes the adverb qʼˤa-x in Tsez. Expressions like "(for) the second time" are formed using the adverbial number suffix -x and ordinal-forming marker āƛiru, thus resulting in the form qʼˤax āƛiru.

== Sample of the Tsez language ==
This is a Tsez tale written in the Asakh dialect using a Latin-based orthography.

Kʼetʼus Hunar
Zewnoƛax zewčʼeyƛax bˤeƛon bocʼin zirun qayno. Sidaquł šigoħno sadaqorno boyno ħukmu: yaqułtow begira bocʼi ħonƛʼār miƛʼeł xizāz xizyo rišʷa yoł. Bˤeƛā begirno qay łˤāł xizāz, bocʼin zirun regirno ħonƛʼār miƛʼeł xizāz. Ɣudod, žedi raynosi beƛʼez reqenyoxor, ziru boqno uhi-ehƛada buq boƛāxzāzarno boqno. Zirus uhi-ehi teqxoy, ɣʷaybi kʼoƛin elār, bocʼi buq bātuzāzarno boqno bikʼin reqenyoƛer, besurno ƛʼarayaw miƛʼi. Miƛʼin bisno bocʼin zirun xizor rutin qʼayƛʼār. Rizirno cʼidoƛʼor ƛoħon begirno łāƛʼor qay. Kikxogon zewno bočʼikʼxo kʼetʼu.

Qayir zewāčʼey rikʷayxo; nešuruxay nełor rikʷayxo zewčʼey. Kʼetʼu, ełor baynosi qay, boqno kʼekʼbikʼa. Kʼekʼbikʼni teqnosi, qay łikin rixerčʼeytow boxin xizor. Bˤeƛā esirno: "Šidā boxā rayirčʼey łin?" Elo didiyƛa žekʼu yoł-ƛin eƛin qayā. Aħugon rikʼin łāxor zirun qayno. Žedi raynosi kikxor žedā esirno kʼetuq: "Mi šebi?" Di žekʼu yoł-ƛin eƛin kʼetʼā. Šebi že debez ħiroƛʼ esirxo zirā. Tupi ƛin eƛix kʼetʼā. Dicce rˤuƛʼno zirun qayno, amma biyxoy kʼetʼu yāłru, xizyo łˤonon zenzi rikʼin raħira reƛ. Bˤeƛo buqełno bičin ažoz kʼodrexāzay, rołikʼno aħyabin kecno, kʼetʼu tataniłxo zewno cʼidox.

Bˤeƛā kʼekʼrikʼerxo zewno aħyabi. Že rikʷayxoy, kʼetʼuz rokʼƛʼor rayno, že elo aw ƛin, hudu betʼtʼun kʼoƛin elor. Dicce bˤuƛʼzāq bˤeƛqo regin ixiytʼatow qˤaƛubin, boxin ciqxār. Bocʼezno qayizno, ziruzno rokʼƛʼor rayno baysi bāsu ixiytow ħaywan šebin, nełoq že riqičʼey kʼiriłno roxin. Cʼikʼiy reƛ miƛes ƛexun kʼetʼur. ʕoƛiran ɣˤudeł kʼetʼu bišno, racʼno baɣʷace dawla bocʼesno zirusno.

Translation:

The Cat's Feat
Once upon a time there were a pig, a wolf, a fox and a hare. One day they gathered together and decided that today they would send the wolf into the mountains for a sheep and they would eat. The pig sent the hare for water and sent the wolf and the fox into the mountain for a ram. At night, when they came to the flock of sheep, the fox began to moan from the eastern side. Since they heard the fox's moaning, the dogs ran in that direction and the wolf went towards the flock from the west and found a fat ram. Having taken the ram, the wolf and the fox returned to the camp. They put the pan on the fire and sent the hare for water. At the spring the cat was freezing.

The hare couldn't see; at night the hare couldn't see. When the hare arrived there, the cat began to move. When he heard the movement, the hare ran back without taking any water. The pig asked: "Why did you run away without bringing water?" The hare said that there was some man there. Again the fox and the hare went to the water. When they came to the spring, they asked the cat: "What are you?" — "I am a man", said the cat. "What is that on your shoulder?", asks the fox. "A rifle", says the cat. The fox and the hare were very frightened, but since they knew it was a cat, afterwards the three of them went together to cook meat. The pig hid behind a bunch of trees and, pushing out its ears, slept, and the cat was warming itself by the fire.

The pig was moving its ears. Since the cat saw it, it thought it was a mouse and in a rush jumped there. The pig was very frightened and, emitting loud shouts, ran away to the forest. The wolf, the hare and the fox thought that a great animal or something was coming and, one running faster than the other, they ran away. All the ram's meat was left to the cat. For seven days the cat ate, ate until it was full the spoils of the wolf and the fox.

== Bibliography ==
- Alekseev, Mikhail E. & Rajabov, Ramazan N. (1993). "Prerequisites to the formation of Tsez writing system". Caucasian Perspectives: 372–376.
- Alekseev, Mikhail E. & Rajabov, Ramazan N. (2004). "Tsez language". In Job, Michael (ed.). Indigenous Languages of the Caucasus. Vol. 3 The North East Caucasian languages, Part 1. Ann Arbor: Caravan Books. ISBN 0-88206-070-8.
- Comrie, Bernard (1999). "Gender affixes in Tsez". The Emergence of the Modern Language Sciences: Studies on the Transition from Historical-Comparative to Structural Linguistics in Honour of E.F.K. Koerner. 2: 279–288.
- Comrie, Bernard (2002). "Participles in Tsez: An emergent word class?". Complex Sentences in Grammar and Discourse: Essays in Honor of Sandra A. Thompson: 19–30. doi:10.1075/z.110.03com.
- Comrie, Bernard (2004). "Oblique-case subjects in Tsez". Non-nominative Subjects. Typological Studies in Language. 1: 113–127. doi:10.1075/tsl.60.07com. ISBN 978-90-272-2970-0.
- Comrie, Bernard & Polinsky, Maria (1998). "The great Daghestanian case hoax". Case, Typology and Grammar: 95–114. doi:10.1075/tsl.38.09com.
- Comrie, Bernard & Polinsky, Maria (1999). "Form and function in syntax: relative clauses in Tsez". Functionalism and Formalism in Linguistics. 2: 77–92. doi:10.1075/slcs.42.06com.
- Comrie, Bernard & Polinsky, Maria (1999). "Reflexivity in Tsez". Typology and Linguistic Theory: From Description to Explanation, for the 60th Birthday of Aleksandr E. Kibrik: 319–339.
- Comrie, Bernard & Polinsky, Maria (2003). "Constraints on reflexivization in Tsez". Current Trends in Caucasian, East European and Inner Asian Linguistics: Papers in Honor of Howard I. Aronson: 265–289.
- Khalilov, Majid Sh. (1999). Цезско-русский словарь (Tsez-Russian dictionary). Moskva: Academia. ISBN 5-87444-086-0
- Polinsky, Maria & Comrie, Bernard (1999). "Agreement in Tsez". Folia Linguistica. 33.2 (Studies in Agreement): 109–130.
- Polinsky, Maria & Potsdam, Eric (2001). "Long-Distance Agreement and Topic in Tsez". Natural Language and Linguistic Theory. 19 (3): 583–646. doi:10.1023/A:1010757806504. S2CID 29405608.
