= Bezhta people =

Bezhta
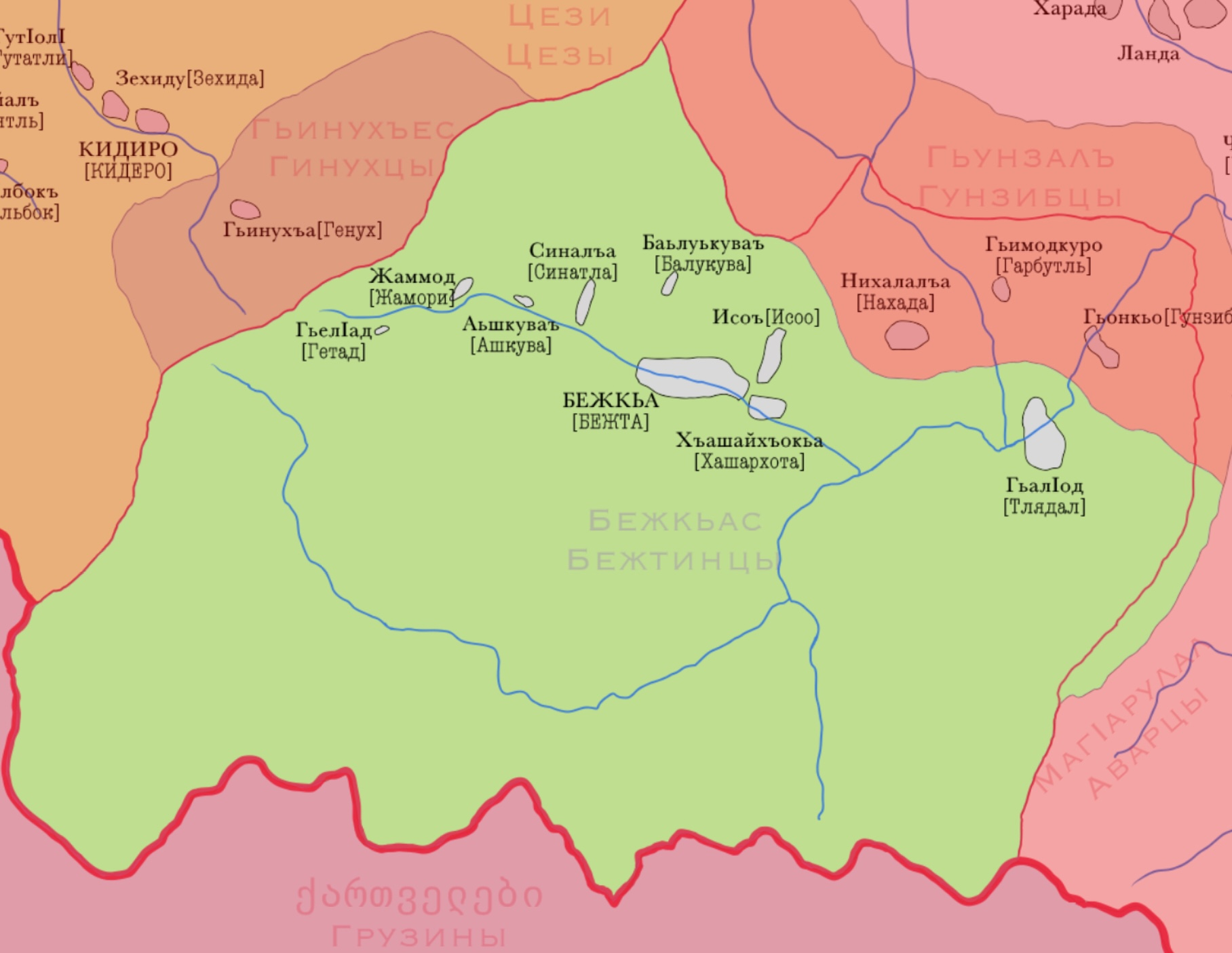

Total population
- 13,000 (high. est.)

Regions with significant populations
- Russia: 6,890 (2021 census)
- Georgia: 850 (2009 estimate)

Languages
- Bezhta, Avar, Russian

Religion
- Sunni Islam

Related ethnic groups
- Northeast Caucasian peoples

The Bezhta (also Kapuchi) are an Andi–Dido people living in the Tsuntinsky region in southwestern Dagestan. In the 1930s along with the rest of the Andi-Dido peoples they were classified as Avars. However, some people identified themselves as Bezhta in the 2002 census of Russia. They speak the Bezhta language, but many of them also speak Avar, Russian or other Tsezic languages of their region. They numbered 1,448 in 1926. According to the Russian census in 2002, there were 6184 self-identified "Bezhtins", though the real number is probably higher.

== History ==
The territory of the Bezhtas was nominally part of the Avar Khanate. In 1806, the Bezhtas were incorporated into the Russian empire. Tight colonial control of the region was enforced during the 1860s and 1870s. During Soviet rule, the Bezhtas witnessed collectivization, urbanization, education mainly taught in the Russian language, and a erosion of Islam and traditional Bezhta culture.

== Culture ==
The Bezhta are primarily Sunni Muslim. The presence of Islam in the land of the Bezhta can be traced back to the 8th and 9th centuries. Most Bezhta adopted the religion around the 16th and 17th centuries due to the influence of Sufi missionaries.

The Bezhtas used to be livestock breeders. They mainly raised sheep, horses and oxen. The Bezhtas also practiced terrace farming and grew rye, wheat and other grains.

== Genetics ==
According to genetic studies in 2016, the following haplogroups are found to predominate among Bezhtas:

- J1 (98%)
- J2 (1%)
- R1b (1%)
