= Bezhta language =

Tsezic language of southwest Dagestan, Russia

Bezhta
- Kapucha
- бежкьалас миц bežƛʼalas mic/beƶⱡʼalas mic
- Pronunciation: [ˈbeʒt͡ɬʼɑlɑs mit͡s]
- Native to: North Caucasus
- Region: Southern Dagestan
- Ethnicity: Bezhta people
- Native speakers: 6,800 (2006–2010); 8,138 (2020 census)
- Language family: Northeast Caucasian: Tsezic; Bezhta–Hunzib–Khwarshi; Bezhta
- Dialects: Bezhta proper; Tladal; Khocharkhota; Turk Bezhta

Language codes
- ISO 639-3: kap
- Glottolog: bezh1248
- ELP: Bezhta
- Bezhta

- Bezhta is classified as Definitely Endangered by the UNESCO Atlas of the World's Languages in Danger (2010)

The Bezhta (or Bezheta) language (Bezhta: бежкьалас миц, bežƛʼalas mic, beƶⱡʼalas mic, pronounced [ˈbeʒt͡ɬʼɑlɑs mit͡s]), also known as Kapucha (from the name of a large village), belongs to the Tsezic group of the North Caucasian language family. It is spoken by about 6,200 people in southern Dagestan, Russia.

== Classification ==
Its closest linguistic relatives are Hunzib and Khwarshi.

== Dialects ==
Bezhta can be divided into three dialects – Bezhta Proper, Tlyadal and Khocharkhota – which are spoken in various villages in the region.

== Phonology ==
Bezhta has a rich consonantal and – unlike its relatives Tsez and Avar – a relatively large vowel inventory (16 distinct vowel phonemes), compared to other languages of the same family.

=== Vowels ===
Bezhta contrasts vowel length and nasalization.

	Oral			Nasal		
	Front		Back	Front		Back
Close	i iː	y yː	u uː	ĩ ĩː	ỹ ỹː	ũ ũː
Mid	e eː	ø øː	o oː	ẽ ẽː	ø̃ ø̃ː	õ õː
Open	æ æː		ɑ ɑː	æ̃ æ̃ː		ɑ̃ ɑ̃ː

=== Consonants ===
		Labial	Alveolar			Palato- alveolar	Velar	Uvular	Pharyngeal	Glottal
		Labial	central	sibilant	lateral	Palato- alveolar	Velar	Uvular	Pharyngeal	Glottal
Nasal		m	n							
Plosive/ Affricate	voiceless	p	t	t͡s	t͡ɬ ~ k͡𝼄	t͡ʃ	k	q͡χ		ʔ
Plosive/ Affricate	ejective	pʼ	tʼ	t͡sʼ	t͡ɬʼ ~ k͡𝼄ʼ	t͡ʃʼ	kʼ	q͡χʼ		ʔ
Plosive/ Affricate	voiced	b	d				ɡ			
Fricative	voiceless			s	ɬ	ʃ		χ	ħ	h
Fricative	voiced			z		ʒ		ʁ	ʕ	
Sonorant		w	r		l	j				

== Orthography ==
Bezhta is unwritten, but various attempts have been made to develop an official orthography for the language. The Bezhta people use Avar as the literary language. The first book ever printed in Bezhta was the Gospel of Luke (1999). The orthography used in translations of biblical texts is as follows:

А а	Аь аь	Аᴴ аᴴ	Аьᴴ аьᴴ	А̄ а̄	Б б	В в	Г г
Гъ гъ	Гь гь	ГӀ гӀ	Д д	Е е	Еᴴ еᴴ	Ж ж	З з
И и	Иᴴ иᴴ	Ӣ ӣ	Й й	К к	Къ къ	Кь кь	КӀ кӀ
Л л	Лъ лъ	ЛӀ лӀ	М м	Н н	О о	Оь оь	Оᴴ оᴴ
Оьᴴ оьᴴ	О̄ о̄	П п	ПӀ пӀ	Р р	С с	Т т	ТӀ тӀ
У у	Уь уь	Уᴴ уᴴ	Уьᴴ уьᴴ	Ӯ ӯ	Х х	Хъ хъ	ХӀ хӀ
Ц ц	ЦӀ цӀ	Ч ч	ЧӀ чӀ	Ш ш	Э э	Эᴴ эᴴ	Ъ ъ

== Morphology ==
Bezhta is mostly agglutinative and the vast amount of locative cases makes its case system particularly rich. The verb morphology is relatively simple. It is an ergative language.

== Numerals ==
Unlike Tsez, Bezhta has a decimal system with the word for twenty being an exception.

	Latin	Cyrillic	IPA
0	nol	нол	nol
1	hõs	гьоᵸс	hõs
2	qʼona	къона	qʼona
3	łana	лъана	ɬana
4	ṏqʼönä	оьᵸкъоьнаь	ø̃qʼønæ
5	łina	лъина	ɬina
6	iłna	илъна	iɬna
7	aƛna	алIна	atɬna
8	beƛna	белIна	betɬna
9	äčʼena	аьчIена	æt͡ʃʼena
10	acʼona	ацIона	at͡sʼona
20	qona	хъона	qona
100	hõsčʼitʼ / -čʼitʼ	гьоᵸсчIитI / -чIитI	hõst͡ʃʼitʼ / -t͡ʃʼitʼ
1000	hazay	гьазай	hazaj

- Multiples of 10 higher than 20 are formed by adding the suffix -yig (-йиг) to the multiplier. Hence, the word for 30 is łanayig (лъанайиг).
- Compound numbers are formed by juxtaposition, the smaller numbers following the greater ones. The number 47 is thus expressed as ṏqʼönäyig aƛna (оьᵸкъоьнаьйиг алIна).

== Sample text ==
This is a passage taken from the Gospel of Luke written in a Cyrillic orthography based on Avar and Chechen, a Latinized transcription and one in IPA.

CYRILLIC	LATIN TRANSCRIPTION	IPA TRANSCRIPTION	TRANSLATION
Гьогцо гьоллохъа нисос:	Hogco holloqa nisos:	[hoɡ.t͡so holː.o.qɑ ni.sos	Jesus said to the followers:
Доьъа богьцалаъ вагьда̄ ниса:	Dö'a bohcala' wahdā nisa:	dɜʔ.ɑ boh.t͡sɑ.lɑʔ wɑh.dɑː ni.sɑ	When you pray, pray like this:
«Йа̄ Або, Дибо ца̄ᵸ аьдамла̄ илагьияб бикӀзи йовала,	«Yā Abo, Dibo cā̃ ädamlā ilahiyab bikʼzi yowala,	jɑː ʔɑ.bo, di.bo t͡sɑ̃ː ʔa.dɑm.lɑː ʔi.lɑ.hi.jɑb bikʼzi jo.wɑ.lɑ	"O Father, we pray that your name will always be kept holy,
Дибо Парчагьлъи йоᵸкъала;	Dibo Parčahłi yõqʼala;	di.bo pɑr.t͡ʃɑh.ɬi jõ.qʼɑ.lɑ	we pray that your kingdom will come;
Шибаб водиъ баццас баьба илол нилӀа;	Šibab wodi' baccas bäba ilol niƛa;	ʃi.bɑb wo.diʔ bɑt͡sː.ɑs ba.bɑ ʔi.lol ni.tɬɑ	give us the food we need for each day;
Илла мунагьла̄кьас кьодос тилӀки, судлӀо нисода илена къацӀцӀола илол кешлъи йо̄вакьас кьодос тилӀбакца.	Illa munahlāƛʼas ƛʼodos tiƛki, sudƛo nisoda ilena qʼacʼcʼola ilol kešłi yōwaƛʼas ƛʼodos tiƛbakca.	ʔi.lːɑ mu.nɑh.lɑːtɬʼ.ɑs tɬʼo.dos ti.tɬki, sud.tɬo ni.sɔ.dɑ ʔi.le.nɑ qʼɑt͡sʼː.o.lɑ ʔi.lol keʃ.ɬi joː.wɑ.tɬʼɑs tɬʼo.dos ti.tɬbɑk.t͡sɑ	forgive us the sins we have done, because we forgive every person that has done wrong to us.
Ми илос гьаьл бикъелална уьᵸхолъа̄къа.»	Mi ilos häl biqʼelalna ü̃xołāqʼa.»	mi ʔi.los hal bi.qʼe.lɑl.nɑ ʔɨ̃.χo.ɬɑː.qʼɑ]	And don't let us be tempted."
