= Tsezic languages =

One of the seven main branches of Northeast Caucasian language family

Tsezic
- Geographic distribution: Southwest Dagestan
- Linguistic classification: Northeast Caucasian: Tsezic
- Subdivisions: Tsez–Hinukh; Bezhta–Hunzib–Khwarshi

Language codes
- Glottolog: tsez1239
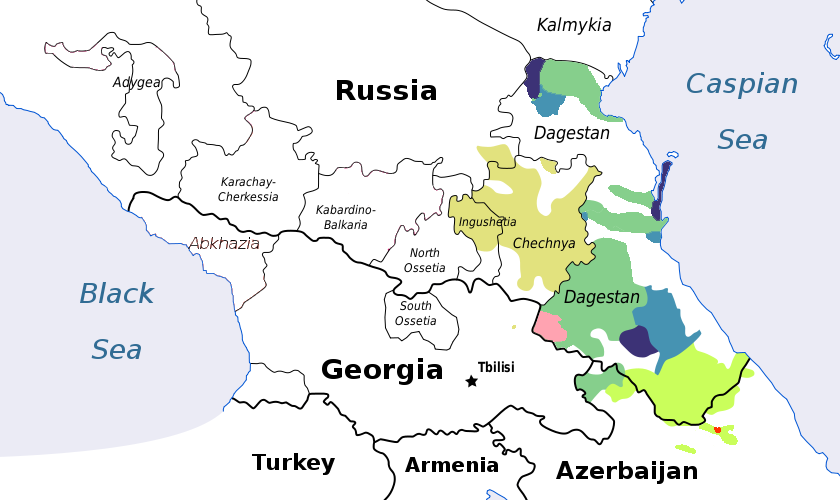
- Tsezic

The Tsezic languages (also called Didoic languages) form one of the seven main branches of the Northeast Caucasian language family. It branches into Tsez–Hinukh and Bezhta–Hunzib–Khwarshi, according to research published in 2009. They were formerly classified geographically into East Tsezic (Hinukh and Bezhta) and West Tsezic (Tsez, Khwarshi and Hunzib). The Avar language serves as the literary language for speakers of Tsezic languages.

== Internal branching ==
Schulze (2009) gives the following family tree for the Tsezic languages:

- Tsezic languages
  - Tsez–Hinukh
    - Tsez (15,400)
    - Hinukh (550)
  - Bezhta–Hunzib–Khwarshi
    - Bezhta (6200)
    - Hunzib (1840)
    - Khwarshi (1870)

Figures retrieved from Ethnologue.

Kassian and Testelets (2015) do not consider Tsez and Hinukh to form a distinct subgroup.

== See also ==
- Languages of the Caucasus
