= Languages of Europe =

A color-coded map of most languages used throughout Europe

There are over 250 languages indigenous to Europe, and most belong to the Indo-European language family. Out of a total European population of 744 million as of 2018, some 94% are native speakers of an Indo-European language. The three largest phyla of the Indo-European language family in Europe are Romance, Germanic, and Slavic; they have more than 200 million speakers each, and together account for close to 90% of Europeans.

Smaller phyla of Indo-European found in Europe include Hellenic (Greek, c. 13 million), Baltic (c. 4.5 million), Albanian (c. 7.5 million), Celtic (c. 4 million), and Armenian (c. 4 million). Indo-Aryan, though a large subfamily of Indo-European, has a relatively small number of languages in Europe, and a small number of speakers (Romani, c. 1.5 million). However, a number of Indo-Aryan languages not native to Europe are spoken in Europe today.

Of the approximately 45 million Europeans speaking non-Indo-European languages, most speak languages within either the Uralic or Turkic families. Still smaller groups — such as Basque (language isolate), Semitic languages (Maltese, c. 0.5 million), and various languages of the Caucasus — account for less than 1% of the European population among them. Immigration has added sizeable communities of speakers of African and Asian languages, amounting to about 4% of the population, with Arabic being the most widely spoken of them.

Five languages have more than 50 million native speakers in Europe: Russian, German, French, Italian, and English. Russian is the most-spoken native language in Europe, and English has the largest number of speakers in total, including some 200 million speakers of English as a second or foreign language. (See English language in Europe.)

== Indo-European languages ==
The Indo-European language family is descended from Proto-Indo-European, which is believed to have been spoken thousands of years ago. Early speakers of Indo-European daughter languages most likely expanded into Europe with the incipient Bronze Age, around 4,000 years ago (Bell-Beaker culture).

=== Germanic ===
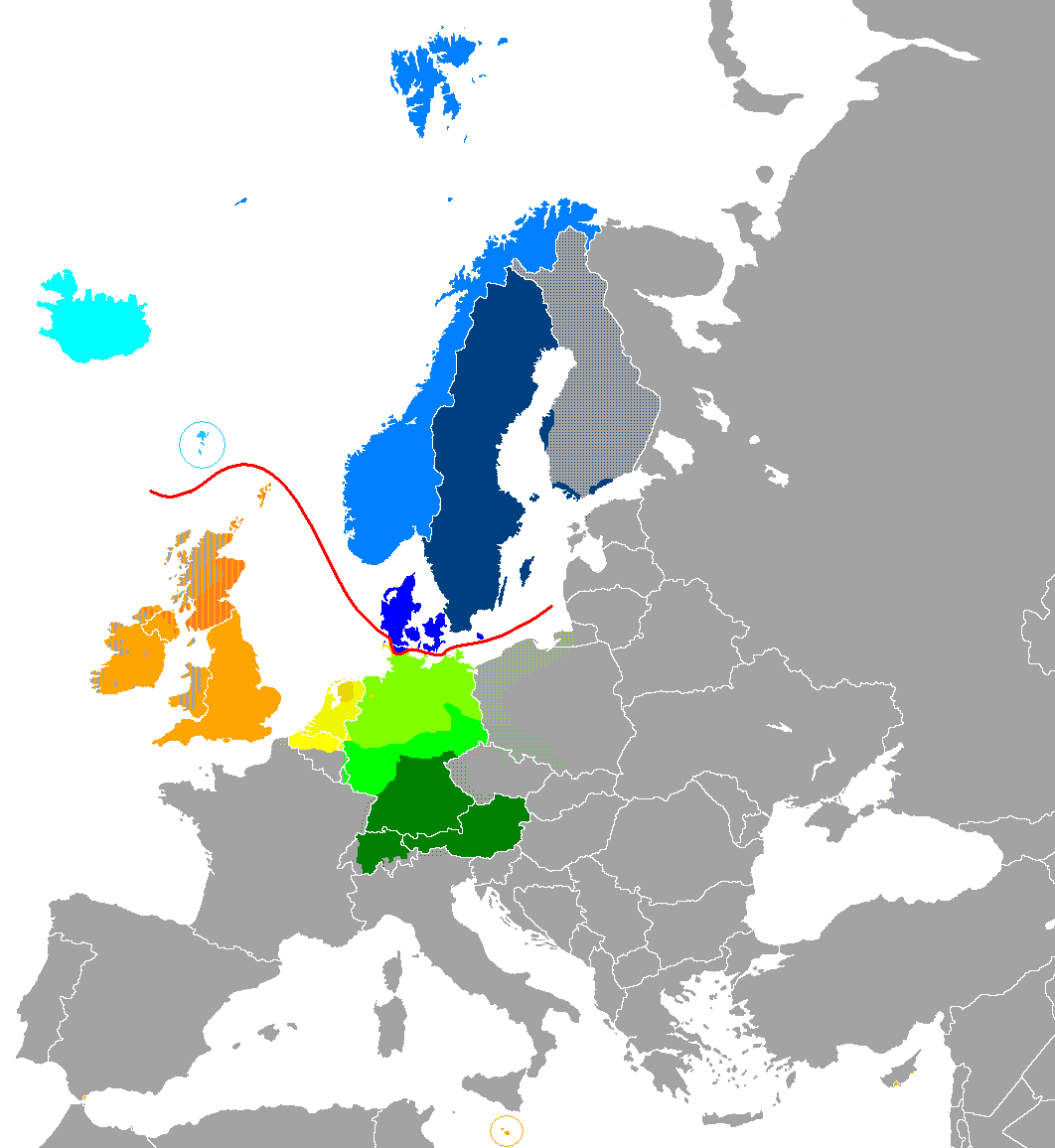
Extent of Germanic languages in present-day Europe: North Germanic languages; Icelandic; Faroese; Norwegian; Swedish; Danish; West Germanic languages; Scots; English; Frisian; Dutch; Flemish; Low German; Central German (High German); Upper German (High German); Dots indicate areas where it is common for L1 non-Germanic speakers to be L2 speakers of a neighbouring Germanic language.; Lines indicate areas where it is common for L1 Germanic speakers to be L2 speakers of a neighbouring non-Germanic or other Germanic language.

The Germanic languages make up the predominant language family in Western, Northern and Central Europe. It is estimated that over 500 million Europeans are speakers of Germanic languages, the largest groups being German (c. 95 million), English (c. 400 million), Dutch (c. 24 million), Swedish (c. 10 million), Danish (c. 6 million), Norwegian (c. 5 million) and Limburgish (c. 1.3 million).

There are two extant major sub-divisions: West Germanic and North Germanic. A third group, East Germanic, is now extinct; the only known surviving East Germanic texts are written in the Gothic language. West Germanic is divided into Anglo-Frisian (including English), Low German, Low Franconian (including Dutch) and High German (including Standard German).

==== Anglo-Frisian ====
The Anglo-Frisian language family is now mostly represented by English (Anglic), descended from the Old English language spoken by the Anglo-Saxons:

- English, the main language of the United Kingdom and the most widespread language in the Republic of Ireland, also spoken as a second or third language by many Europeans.
- Scots, spoken in Scotland and Ulster, recognized by some as a language and by others as a dialect of English (not to be confused with Scots-Gaelic of the Celtic language family).

The Frisian languages are spoken by about 400,000 (as of 2015) Frisians, who live on the southern coast of the North Sea in the Netherlands and Germany. These languages include West Frisian, East Frisian (of which the only surviving dialect is Saterlandic) and North Frisian.

==== Dutch ====
Dutch is spoken throughout the Netherlands, the northern half of Belgium, as well as the Nord-Pas de Calais region of France. The traditional dialects of the Lower Rhine region of Germany are linguistically more closely related to Dutch than to modern German. In Belgian and French contexts, Dutch is sometimes referred to as Flemish. Dutch dialects are numerous and varied.

==== German ====
German is spoken throughout Germany, Austria, Liechtenstein, much of Switzerland, northern Italy (South Tyrol), Luxembourg, the East Cantons of Belgium and the Alsace and Lorraine regions of France.

There are several groups of German dialects:

- High German includes several dialect families:
  - Standard German
  - Central German dialects, spoken in central Germany and including Luxembourgish
  - High Franconian, a family of transitional dialects between Central and Upper High German
  - Upper German, including Bavarian and Swiss German
  - Yiddish is a Jewish language developed in Germany and Eastern Europe. It shares many features of High German dialects and Hebrew.

==== Low German ====
Low German is spoken in various regions throughout Northern Germany and the northern and eastern parts of the Netherlands. It may be separated into West Low German and East Low German.

==== North Germanic (Scandinavian) ====
The North Germanic languages are spoken in Nordic countries and include Swedish (Sweden and parts of Finland), Danish (Denmark), Norwegian (Norway), Icelandic (Iceland), Faroese (Faroe Islands), and Elfdalian (in a small part of central Sweden).

English has a long history of contact with Scandinavian languages, given the immigration of Scandinavians early in the history of Britain, and shares various features with the Scandinavian languages. Even so, especially Dutch and Swedish, but also Danish and Norwegian, have strong vocabulary connections to the German language.

=== Romance ===
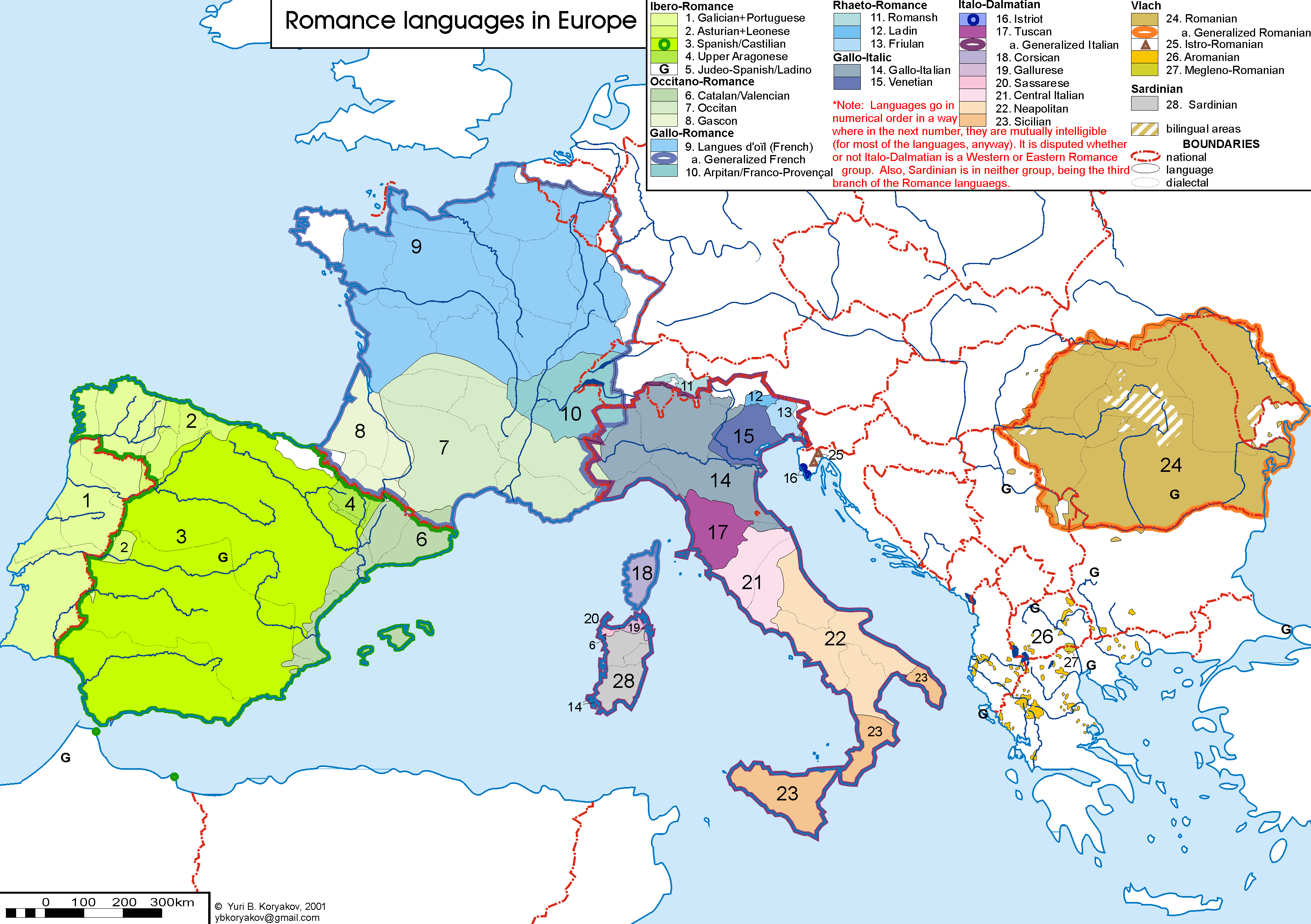
Distribution of the Romance languages, 20th century

Roughly 215 million Europeans (primarily in Southern and Western Europe) are native speakers of Romance languages, the largest groups including:

French (c. 72 million), Italian (c. 65 million), Spanish (c. 40 million), Romanian (c. 24 million), Portuguese (c. 10 million), Catalan (c. 7 million), Neapolitan (c. 6 million), Sicilian (c. 5 million), Venetian (c. 4 million), Galician (c. 2 million), Sardinian (c. 1 million), Occitan (c. 500,000), besides numerous smaller communities.

The Romance languages evolved from varieties of Vulgar Latin spoken in the various parts of the Roman Empire in Late Antiquity. Latin was itself part of the (otherwise extinct) Italic branch of Indo-European. Romance languages are divided phylogenetically into Italo-Western, Eastern Romance (including Romanian) and Sardinian. The Romance-speaking area of Europe is occasionally referred to as Latin Europe.

Italo-Western can be further broken down into the Italo-Dalmatian languages (sometimes grouped with Eastern Romance), including the Tuscan-derived Italian and numerous local Romance languages in Italy as well as Dalmatian, and the Western Romance languages. The Western Romance languages in turn separate into the Gallo-Romance languages, including Langues d'oïl such as French, the Francoprovencalic languages Arpitan and Faetar, the Rhaeto-Romance languages, and the Gallo-Italic languages; the Occitano-Romance languages, grouped with either Gallo-Romance or East Iberian, including Occitanic languages such as Occitan and Gardiol, and Catalan; Aragonese, grouped in with either Occitano-Romance or West Iberian, and finally the West Iberian languages, including the Astur-Leonese languages, the Galician-Portuguese languages, and the Castilian languages.

=== Slavic ===
Political map of Europe with countries where the national language is Slavic: West Slavic languages East Slavic languages South Slavic languages

Slavic languages are spoken in large areas of Southern, Central and Eastern Europe. An estimated 315 million people speak a Slavic language, the largest groups being Russian (c. 110 million in European Russia and adjacent parts of Eastern Europe, Russian forming the largest linguistic community in Europe), Polish (c. 40 million), Ukrainian (c. 33 million), Serbo-Croatian (c. 18 million), Czech (c. 11 million), Bulgarian (c. 8 million), Slovak (c. 5 million), Belarusian (c. 3.7 million), Slovene (c. 2.3 million) and Macedonian (c. 1.6 million).

Phylogenetically, Slavic is divided into three subgroups:

- West Slavic includes Polish, Polabian, Czech, Knaanic, Slovak, Lower Sorbian, Upper Sorbian, Silesian and Kashubian.
- East Slavic includes Russian, Ukrainian, Belarusian, Ruthenian, and Rusyn.
- South Slavic includes Slovene and Serbo-Croatian in the southwest and Bulgarian, Macedonian and Church Slavonic (a liturgical language) in the southeast, each with numerous distinctive dialects. South Slavic languages constitute a dialect continuum where standard Slovene, Macedonian and Bulgarian are each based on a distinct dialect, whereas pluricentric Serbo-Croatian boasts four mutually intelligible national standard varieties all based on a single dialect, Shtokavian.

=== Others ===
- Greek (c. 13 million) is the official language of Greece and Cyprus, and there are Greek-speaking enclaves in Albania, Bulgaria, Italy, North Macedonia, Romania, Georgia, Ukraine, Lebanon, Egypt, Israel, Jordan, and Turkey, and in Greek communities around the world. Dialects of modern Greek that originate from Attic Greek (through Koine and then Medieval Greek) are Cappadocian, Pontic, Cretan, Cypriot, Katharevousa, and Yevanic.
  - Italiot Greek is, debatably, a Doric dialect of Greek. It is spoken in southern Italy only, in the southern Calabria region (as Grecanic) and in the Salento region (as Griko). It was studied by the German linguist Gerhard Rohlfs during the 1930s and 1950s.
  - Tsakonian is a Doric dialect of the Greek language spoken in the lower Arcadia region of the Peloponnese around the village of Leonidio

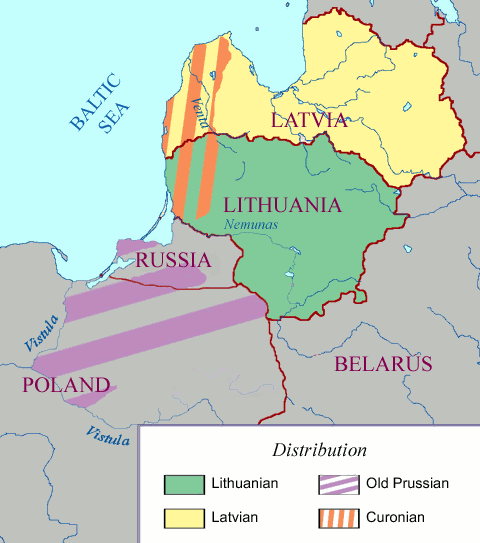
Historic distribution of the Baltic languages in the Baltic (simplified)

- The Baltic languages are spoken in Lithuania (Lithuanian (c. 3 million), Samogitian) and Latvia (Latvian (c. 1.5 million), Latgalian). Samogitian and Latgalian used to be considered dialects of Lithuanian and Latvian respectively.
  - There are also several extinct Baltic languages, including: Curonian, Galindian, Old Prussian, Selonian, Semigallian, and Sudovian.
- Albanian (c. 7.5 million) has two major dialects, Tosk Albanian and Gheg Albanian. It is spoken in Albania and Kosovo, neighboring North Macedonia, Serbia, Italy, and Montenegro. It is also widely spoken in the Albanian diaspora.
- Armenian (c. 7 million) has two major forms, Western Armenian and Eastern Armenian. It is spoken in Armenia, Azerbaijan, Georgia (Samtskhe-Javakheti) and Abkhazia, also Russia, France, Italy, Turkey, Greece, and Cyprus. It is also widely spoken in the Armenian Diaspora.
- There are six living Celtic languages, spoken in areas of northwestern Europe dubbed the "Celtic nations". All six are members of the Insular Celtic family, which in turn is divided into:
  - Brittonic family: Welsh (Wales, c. 843,500), Cornish (Cornwall, c. 500) and Breton (Brittany, c. 206,000)
  - Goidelic family: Irish (Ireland, c. 1.7 million), Scottish Gaelic (Scotland, c. 57,400), and Manx (Isle of Man, 1,660)

Continental Celtic languages had previously been spoken across Europe from Iberia and Gaul to Asia Minor, but became extinct in the first millennium CE.

- The Indo-Aryan languages have one major representative: Romani (c. 4.6 million speakers), introduced in Europe during the late medieval period. Lacking a nation state, Romani is spoken as a minority language throughout Europe.
- The Iranian languages in Europe are natively represented in the North Caucasus, notably with Ossetian (c. 600,000).

== Uralic languages ==
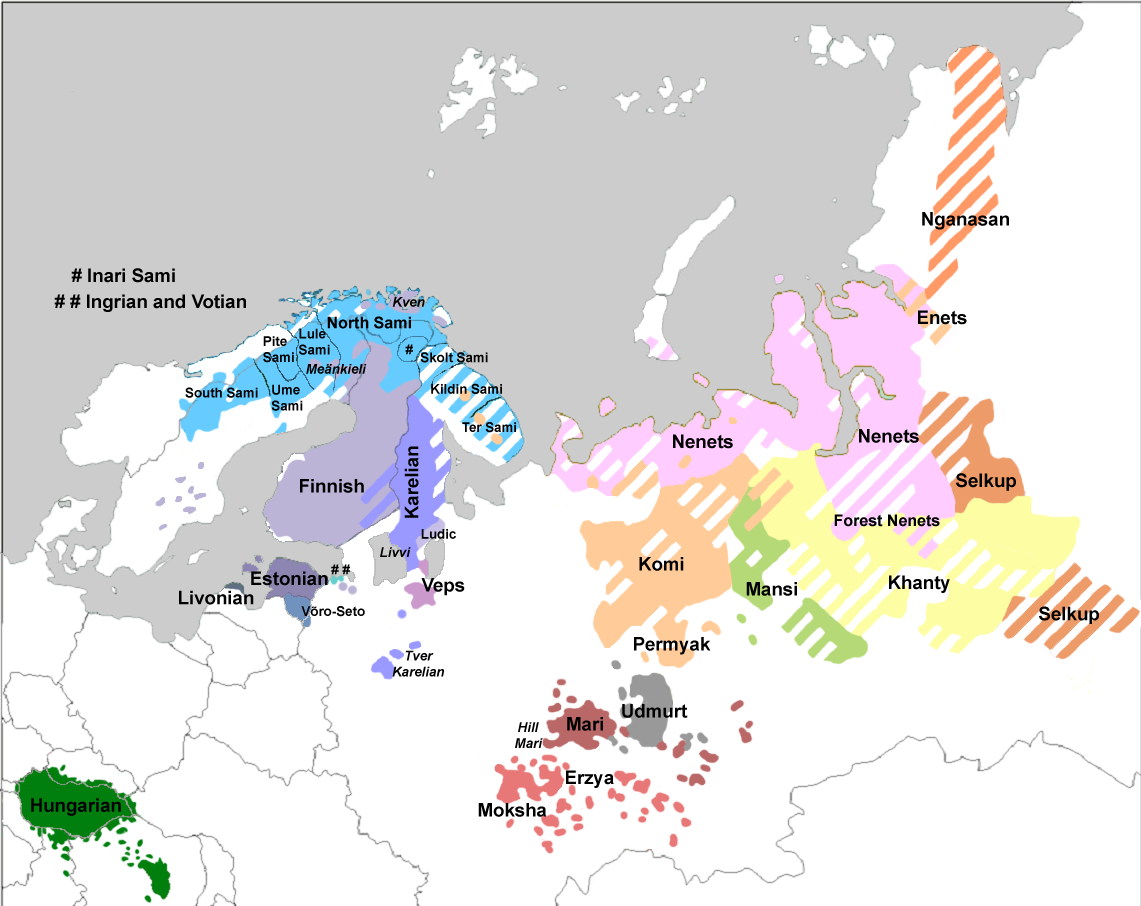
Distribution of Uralic languages in Eurasia

Finnic languages include Finnish (c. 5 million) and Estonian (c. 1 million), as well as smaller languages such as Kven (c. 8,000). Other languages of the Finno-Permic branch of the family include e.g. Mari (c. 400,000), and the Sami languages (c. 30,000).

The Ugric branch of the language family is represented in Europe by the Hungarian language (c. 13 million), historically introduced with the Hungarian conquest of the Carpathian Basin of the 9th century. The Samoyedic Nenets language is spoken in Nenets Autonomous Okrug of Russia, located in the far northeastern corner of Europe (as delimited by the Ural Mountains).

== Semitic languages ==
- Maltese (c. 500,000) is a Semitic language with Romance and Germanic influences, spoken in Malta. It is based on Siculo-Arabic, with influences from Sicilian, Italian, French and, more recently, English. It is the only Semitic language whose standard form is written in Latin script. It is also the second smallest official language of the EU in terms of speakers (after Irish), and the only official Semitic language within the EU.
- Cypriot Maronite Arabic (also known as Cypriot Arabic) is a variety of Arabic spoken by Maronites in Cyprus. Most speakers live in Nicosia, but others are in the communities of Kormakiti and Lemesos. Brought to the island by Maronites fleeing Lebanon over 700 years ago, this variety of Arabic has been influenced by Greek in both phonology and vocabulary, while retaining certain unusually archaic features in other respects.
- Eastern Aramaic, a Semitic language is spoken by Assyrian communities in the Caucasus and southern Russia who fled the Assyrian Genocide during World War I, and also by Assyrian communities in the Assyrian diaspora in other parts of Europe.

== Turkic languages ==
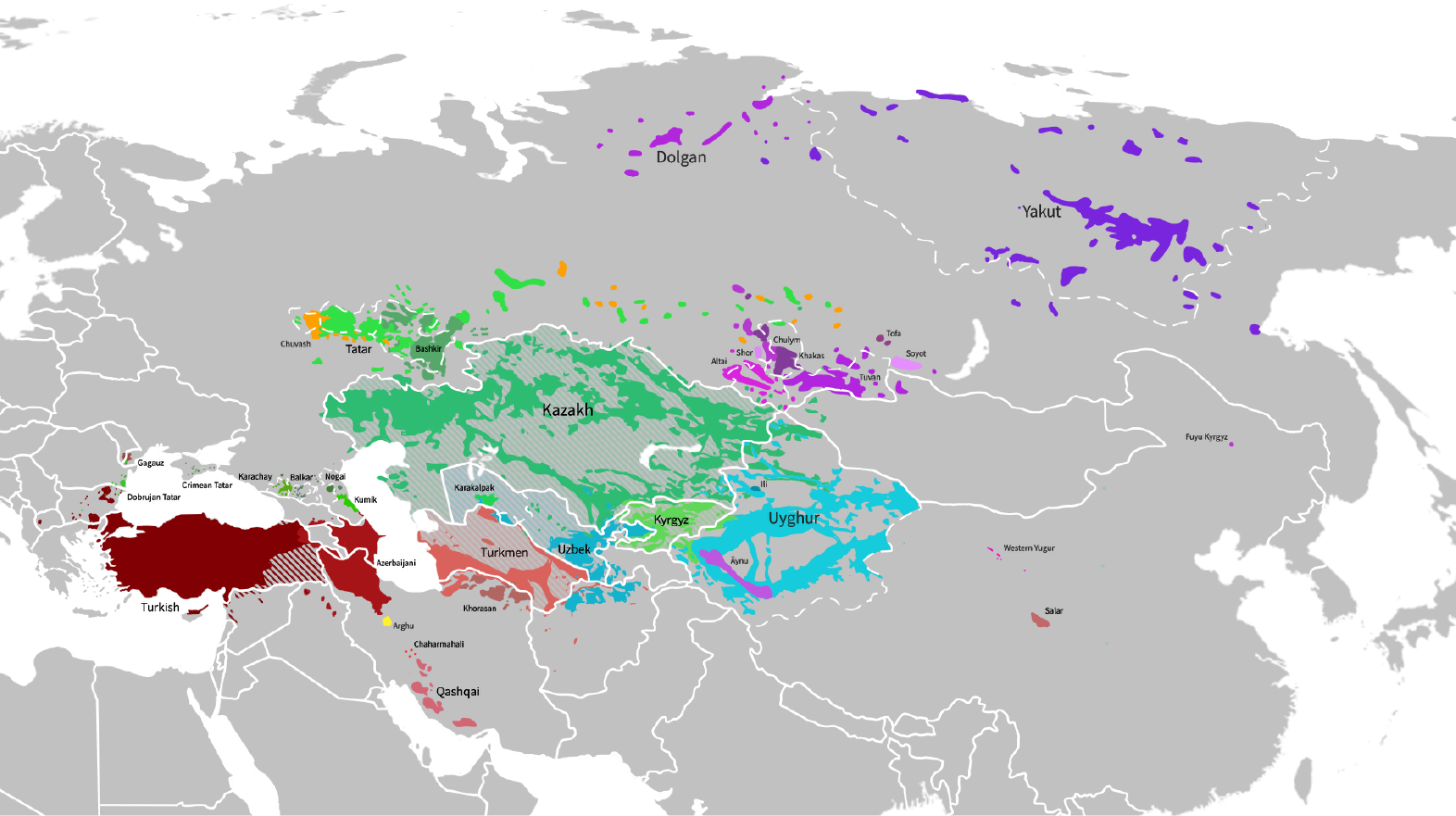
Distribution of Turkic languages in Eurasia

- Oghuz languages in Europe include Turkish, spoken in East Thrace and by immigrant communities; Azerbaijani is spoken in Northeast Azerbaijan and parts of Southern Russia and Gagauz is spoken in Gagauzia.
- Kipchak languages in Europe include Karaim, Crimean Tatar and Krymchak, which is spoken mainly in Crimea; Tatar, which is spoken in Tatarstan; Bashkir, which is spoken in Bashkortostan; Karachay-Balkar, which is spoken in the North Caucasus, and Kazakh, which is spoken in Northwest Kazakhstan.
- Oghur languages were historically indigenous to much of Eastern Europe; however, most of them are extinct today, with the exception of Chuvash, which is spoken in Chuvashia.

== Other languages ==
Map of countries where most people's native language is not Indo-European

- The Basque language (or Euskara, c. 750,000) is a language isolate and the ancestral language of the Basque people who inhabit the Basque Country, a region in the western Pyrenees mountains mostly in northeastern Spain and partly in southwestern France of about 3 million inhabitants, where it is spoken fluently by about 750,000 and understood by more than 1.5 million people. Basque is directly related to ancient Aquitanian, and it is likely that an early form of the Basque language was present in Western Europe before the arrival of the Indo-European languages in the area in the Bronze Age.
- The Northwest Caucasian family (including Abkhaz and Circassian).
- The Northeast Caucasian family, spoken mainly in the border area of the southern Russian Federation (including Dagestan, Chechnya, and Ingushetia) and northern Azerbaijan.
- Kalmyk is a Mongolic language, spoken in the Republic of Kalmykia, part of the Russian Federation. Its speakers entered the Volga region in the early 17th century.
- Kartvelian languages (also known as South Caucasian languages), the most common of which is Georgian (c. 3.5 million), others being Mingrelian, Laz and Svan, spoken mainly in the Caucasus and Anatolia.

=== Sign languages ===
Several dozen manual languages exist across Europe, with the most widespread sign language family being the Francosign languages, with languages found in countries from Iberia to the Balkans and the Baltics. Accurate historical information of sign and tactile languages is difficult to come by, with folk histories noting the existence signing communities across Europe hundreds of years ago. British Sign Language (BSL) and French Sign Language (LSF) are probably the oldest confirmed, continuously used sign languages. Alongside German Sign Language (DGS) according to Ethnologue, these three have the most numbers of signers.

Notably, few European sign languages have overt connections with the local majority/oral languages, aside from standard language contact and borrowing, meaning grammatically the sign languages and the oral languages of Europe are quite distinct from one another. Due to (visual/aural) modality differences, most sign languages are named for the larger ethnic nation in which they are spoken, plus the words "sign language", rendering what is spoken across much of France, Wallonia and Romandy as French Sign Language or LSF for: langue des signes française.

Recognition of non-oral languages varies widely from region to region. Some countries afford legal recognition, even to official on a state level, whereas others continue to be actively suppressed.

Though "there is a widespread belief—among both Deaf people and sign language linguists—that there are sign language families," the actual relationship between sign languages is difficult to ascertain. Concepts and methods used in historical linguistics to describe language families for written and spoken languages are not easily mapped onto signed languages. Some of the current understandings of sign language relationships, however, provide some reasonable estimates about potential sign language families:

- Francosign languages, such as LSF, ASL, Dutch Sign Language, Flemish Sign Language, and Italian Sign Language.
- BANZSL languages, including British Sign Language (BSL), New Zealand Sign Language (NZSL), Australian Sign Language (Auslan), and Swedish Sign Language.
- Isolate languages, such as Albanian Sign Language, Armenian Sign Language, Caucasian Sign Language, Spanish Sign Language (LSE), Turkish Sign Language (TİD), and perhaps Ghardaia Sign Language.
- Many other sign languages, such as Irish Sign Language (ISL), have unclear origins.

== History of standardization ==
=== Language and identity, standardization processes ===
In the Middle Ages the two most important defining elements of Europe were Christianitas and Latinitas.

The earliest dictionaries were glossaries: more or less structured lists of lexical pairs (in alphabetical order or according to conceptual fields). The Latin-German (Latin-Bavarian) Abrogans was among the first. A new wave of lexicography can be seen from the late 15th century onwards (after the introduction of the printing press, with the growing interest in standardization of languages).

The concept of the nation state began to emerge in the early modern period. Nations adopted particular dialects as their national language. This, together with improved communications, led to official efforts to standardize the national language, and a number of language academies were established: 1582 Accademia della Crusca in Florence, 1617 Fruchtbringende Gesellschaft in Weimar, 1635 Académie française in Paris, 1713 Real Academia Española in Madrid. Language became increasingly linked to nation as opposed to culture, and was also used to promote religious and ethnic identity: e.g. different Bible translations in the same language for Catholics and Protestants.

The first languages whose standardisation was promoted included Italian (questione della lingua: Modern Tuscan/Florentine vs. Old Tuscan/Florentine vs. Venetian → Modern Florentine + archaic Tuscan + Upper Italian), French (the standard is based on Parisian), English (the standard is based on the London dialect) and (High) German (based on the dialects of the chancellery of Meissen in Saxony, Middle German, and the chancellery of Prague in Bohemia ("Common German")). But several other nations also began to develop a standard variety in the 16th century.

=== Lingua franca ===
Europe has had a number of languages that were considered linguae francae over some ranges for some periods according to some historians. Typically in the rise of a national language the new language becomes a lingua franca to peoples in the range of the future nation until the consolidation and unification phases. If the nation becomes internationally influential, its language may become a lingua franca among nations that speak their own national languages. Europe has had no lingua franca ranging over its entire territory spoken by all or most of its populations during any historical period. Some linguae francae of past and present over some of its regions for some of its populations are:

- Classical Greek and then Koine Greek in the Mediterranean Basin from the Athenian Empire to the Eastern Roman Empire, being replaced by Modern Greek.
- Koine Greek and Modern Greek, in the Eastern Roman or Byzantine Empire and other parts of the Balkans south of the Jireček Line.
- Vulgar Latin and Late Latin among the uneducated and educated populations respectively of the Roman Empire and the states that followed it in the same range no later than 900 AD; Medieval Latin and Renaissance Latin among the educated populations of western, northern, central and part of eastern Europe until the rise of the national languages in that range, beginning with the first language academy in Italy in 1582/83; Neo-Latin written only in scholarly and scientific contexts by a small minority of the educated population at scattered locations over all of Europe; ecclesiastical Latin, in spoken and written contexts of liturgy and church administration only, over the range of the Roman Catholic Church.
- Old Occitan in central and southern France, north-western Italy and the main territories of the crown of Aragon (Catalonia, Valencia, the Balearic Islands and Aragon).
- Lingua Franca or Sabir, the original of the name, an Italian and Catalan-based pidgin language of mixed origins used by maritime commercial interests around the Mediterranean in the Middle Ages and early Modern Age.
- Old French in continental western European countries and in the Crusader states.
- Czech, mainly during the reign of Holy Roman Emperor Charles IV (14th century) but also during other periods of Bohemian control over the Holy Roman Empire.
- Middle Low German, around the 14th–16th century, during the heyday of the Hanseatic League, mainly in Northeastern Europe across the Baltic Sea.
- Spanish as Castilian in Spain and New Spain from the times of the Catholic Monarchs and Columbus, c. 1492; that is, after the Reconquista, until established as a national language in the times of Louis XIV, c. 1648; subsequently multinational in all nations in or formerly in the Spanish Empire.
- Italian due to the Renaissance, the opera, the Italian Empire, the fashion industry and the influence of the Roman Catholic church.
- French from the golden age under Cardinal Richelieu and Louis XIV c. 1648; i.e., after the Thirty Years' War, in France and the French colonial empire, until established as the national language during the French Revolution of 1789 and subsequently multinational in all nations in or formerly in the various French Empires.
- German in Northern, Central, and Eastern Europe.
- English in Great Britain until its consolidation as a national language in the Renaissance and the rise of Modern English; subsequently internationally under the various states in or formerly in the British Empire; globally since the victories of the predominantly English speaking countries (United States, United Kingdom, Canada, Australia, New Zealand, and others) and their allies in the two world wars ending in 1918 (World War I) and 1945 (World War II) and the subsequent rise of the United States as a superpower and major cultural influence.
- Russian in the former Soviet Union and Russian Empire including Northern and Central Asia.

=== Linguistic minorities ===
Historical attitudes towards linguistic diversity are illustrated by two French laws: the Ordonnance de Villers-Cotterêts (1539), which said that every document in France should be written in French (neither in Latin nor in Occitan) and the Loi Toubon (1994), which aimed to eliminate anglicisms from official documents. States and populations within a state have often resorted to war to settle their differences. There have been attempts to prevent such hostilities: two such initiatives were promoted by the Council of Europe, founded in 1949, which affirms the right of minority language speakers to use their language fully and freely. The Council of Europe is committed to protecting linguistic diversity. Currently all European countries except France, Andorra and Turkey have signed the Framework Convention for the Protection of National Minorities, while Greece, Iceland and Luxembourg have signed it, but have not ratified it; this framework entered into force in 1998. Another European treaty, the European Charter for Regional or Minority Languages, was adopted in 1992 under the auspices of the Council of Europe: it entered into force in 1998, and while it is legally binding for 24 countries, France, Iceland, Italy, North Macedonia, Moldova and Russia have chosen to sign without ratifying the convention.

=== Scripts ===
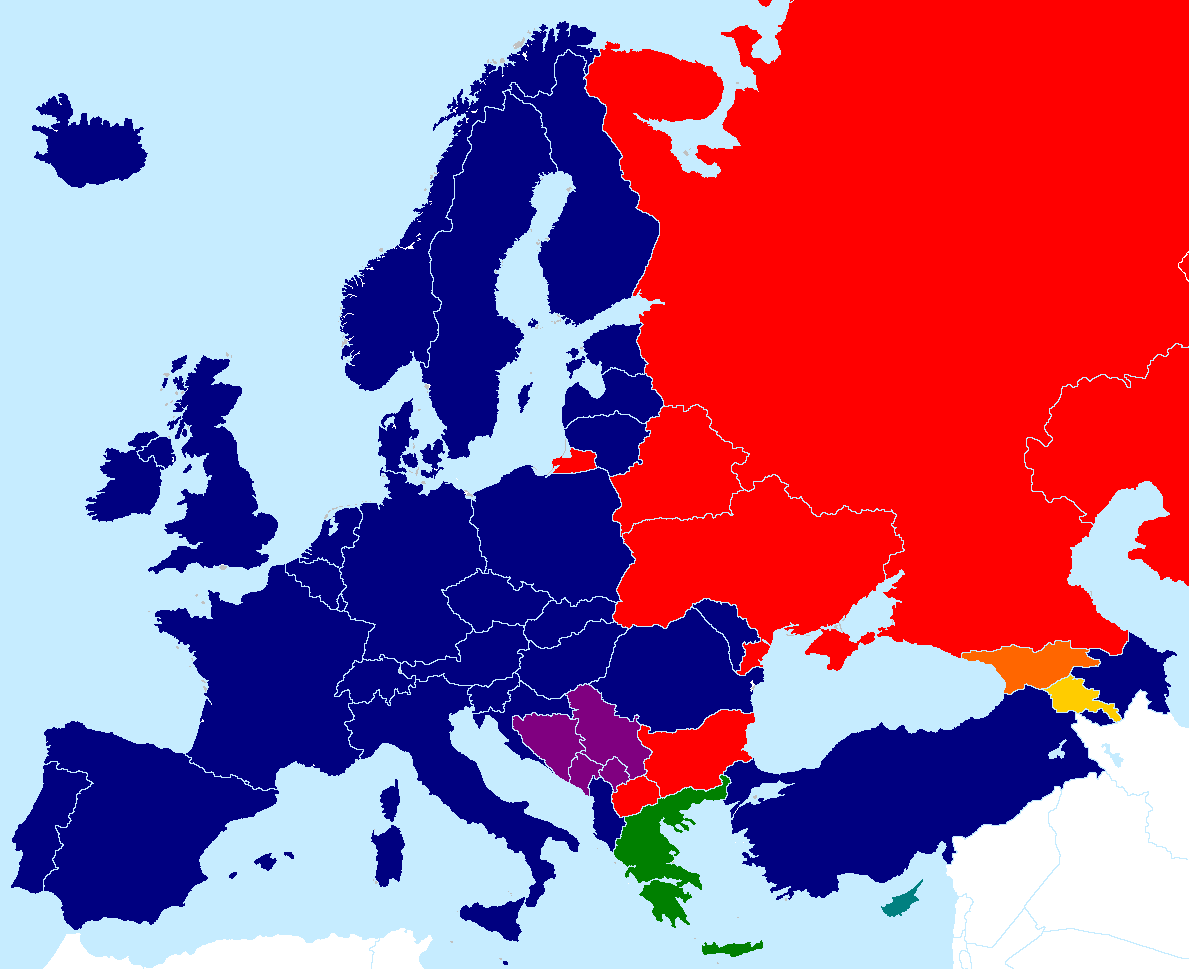
Alphabets used in European national languages: Greek Greek & Latin Latin Latin & Cyrillic Cyrillic Georgian Armenian

The main scripts used in Europe today are the Latin and Cyrillic.

The Greek alphabet was derived from the Phoenician alphabet, and Latin was derived from the Greek via the Old Italic alphabet. In the Early Middle Ages, Ogham was used in Ireland and runes (derived from Old Italic script) in Scandinavia. Both were replaced in general use by the Latin alphabet by the Late Middle Ages. The Cyrillic script was derived from the Greek with the first texts appearing around 940 AD.

Around 1900 there were mainly two typeface variants of the Latin alphabet used in Europe: Antiqua and Fraktur. Fraktur was used most for German, Estonian, Latvian, Norwegian and Danish whereas Antiqua was used for Italian, Spanish, French, Polish, Portuguese, English, Romanian, Swedish and Finnish. The Fraktur variant was banned by Hitler in 1941, having been described as "Schwabacher Jewish letters". Other scripts have historically been in use in Europe, including Phoenician, from which modern Latin letters descend, Ancient Egyptian hieroglyphs on Egyptian artefacts traded during Antiquity, various runic systems used in Northern Europe preceding Christianisation, and Arabic during the era of the Ottoman Empire.

Hungarian rovás was used by the Hungarian people in the early Middle Ages, but it was gradually replaced with the Latin-based Hungarian alphabet when Hungary became a kingdom, though it was revived in the 20th century and has certain marginal, but growing area of usage since then.

=== European Union ===
The European Union (as of 2021) had 27 member states accounting for a population of 447 million, or about 60% of the population of Europe.

The European Union has designated by agreement with the member states 24 languages as "official and working": Bulgarian, Croatian, Czech, Danish, Dutch, English, Estonian, Finnish, French, German, Greek, Hungarian, Irish, Italian, Latvian, Lithuanian, Maltese, Polish, Portuguese, Romanian, Slovak, Slovenian, Spanish and Swedish. This designation provides member states with two "entitlements": the member state may communicate with the EU in any of the designated languages, and view "EU regulations and other legislative documents" in that language.

The European Union and the Council of Europe have been collaborating in education of member populations in languages for "the promotion of plurilingualism" among EU member states. The joint document, "Common European Framework of Reference for Languages: Learning, Teaching, Assessment (CEFR)", is an educational standard defining "the competencies necessary for communication" and related knowledge for the benefit of educators in setting up educational programs. In a 2005 independent survey requested by the EU's Directorate-General for Education and Culture regarding the extent to which major European languages were spoken in member states. The results were published in a 2006 document, "Europeans and Their Languages", or "Eurobarometer 243". In this study, statistically relevant samples of the population in each country were asked to fill out a survey form concerning the languages that they spoke with sufficient competency "to be able to have a conversation".

== List of languages ==
The following is a table of European languages. The number of speakers as a first or second language (L1 and L2 speakers) listed are speakers in Europe only; (Note: "Europe" is taken as a geographical term, defined by the conventional Europe-Asia boundary along the Caucasus and the Urals. Estimates for populations geographically in Europe are given for transcontinental countries.) see list of languages by number of native speakers and list of languages by total number of speakers for global estimates on numbers of speakers.

The list is intended to include any language variety with an ISO 639 code. However, it omits sign languages. Because the ISO-639-2 and ISO-639-3 codes have different definitions, this means that some communities of speakers may be listed more than once. For instance, speakers of Bavarian are listed both under "Bavarian" (ISO-639-3 code bar) as well as under "German" (ISO-639-2 code de).

Name	ISO- 639	Classification	Speakers in Europe		Official status	
Name	ISO- 639	Classification	Native	Total	National (Note: Sovereign states, defined as United Nations member states and observer states. 'Recognised minority language' status is not included.)	Regional
Abaza	abq	Northwest Caucasian, Abazgi	49,800			Karachay-Cherkessia (Russia)
Adyghe	ady	Northwest Caucasian, Circassian	117,500			Adygea (Russia)
Aghul	agx	Northeast Caucasian, Lezgic	29,300			Dagestan (Russia)
Akhvakh	akv	Northeast Caucasian, Avar–Andic	210			
Albanian (Shqip); Arbëresh; Arvanitika	sq	Indo-European	5,367,000; 5,877,100 (Balkans)		Albania, Kosovo (Note: The Republic of Kosovo is a partially recognized state (recognized by 111 out of 193 UN member states as of 2017).), North Macedonia	Italy, Arbëresh dialect: Sicily, Calabria, Apulia, Molise, Basilicata, Abruzzo, Campania; Montenegro (Ulcinj, Tuzi)
Andi	ani	Northeast Caucasian, Avar–Andic	5,800			
Aragonese	an	Indo-European, Romance, Western, West Iberian	25,000	55,000		Northern Aragon (Spain) (Note: Recognized and protected, but not official.)
Archi	acq	Northeast Caucasian, Lezgic	970			
Aromanian	rup	Indo-European, Romance, Eastern	114,000			North Macedonia (Kruševo)
Asturian (Astur-Leonese)	ast	Indo-European, Romance, Western, West Iberian	351,791	641,502		Asturias
Avar	av	Northeast Caucasian, Avar–Andic	760,000			Dagestan (Russia)
Azerbaijani	az	Turkic, Oghuz	500,000		Azerbaijan	Dagestan (Russia)
Bagvalal	kva	Northeast Caucasian, Avar–Andic	1,500			
Bashkir	ba	Turkic, Kipchak	1,221,000			Bashkortostan (Russia)
Basque	eu	Basque	750,000			Basque Country: Basque Autonomous Community, Navarre (Spain), French Basque Country (France)
Bavarian	bar	Indo-European, Germanic, West, High German, Upper, Bavarian	14,000,000		Austria (as German)	South Tyrol
Belarusian	be	Indo-European, Slavic, East	3,300,000		Belarus	
Bezhta	kap	Northeast Caucasian, Tsezic	6,800			
Bosnian	bs	Indo-European, Slavic, South, Western, Serbo-Croatian	2,500,000		Bosnia and Herzegovina	Kosovo, Montenegro
Botlikh	bph	Northeast Caucasian, Avar–Andic	210			
Breton	br	Indo-European, Celtic, Brittonic	206,000			None, de facto status in Brittany (France)
Bulgarian	bg	Indo-European, Slavic, South, Eastern	7,800,000		Bulgaria	Mount Athos (Greece)
Catalan	ca	Indo-European, Romance, Western, Occitano-Romance	4,000,000	10,000,000	Andorra	Balearic Islands (Spain), Catalonia (Spain), Valencian Community (Spain), easternmost Aragon (Spain), Pyrénées-Orientales (France), Alghero (Italy)
Chamalal	cji	Northeast Caucasian, Avar–Andic	500			
Chechen	ce	Northeast Caucasian, Nakh	1,400,000			Chechnya & Dagestan (Russia)
Chuvash	cv	Turkic, Oghur	1,100,000			Chuvashia (Russia)
Cimbrian	cim	Indo-European, Germanic, West, High German, Upper, Bavarian	400			
Cornish	kw	Indo-European, Celtic, Brittonic	563			Cornwall (United Kingdom)
Corsican	co	Indo-European, Romance, Italo-Dalmatian	30,000	125,000		Corsica (France), Sardinia (Italy)
Crimean Tatar	crh	Turkic, Kipchak	480,000			Crimea (Ukraine)
Croatian	hr	Indo-European, Slavic, South, Western, Serbo-Croatian	5,600,000		Bosnia and Herzegovina, Croatia	Burgenland (Austria), Vojvodina (Serbia)
Czech	cs	Indo-European, Slavic, West, Czech–Slovak	10,600,000		Czech Republic	
Danish	da	Indo-European, Germanic, North	5,500,000		Denmark	Faroe Islands (Denmark), Schleswig-Holstein (Germany)
Dargwa	dar	Northeast Caucasian, Dargin	490,000			Dagestan (Russia)
Dutch	nl	Indo-European, Germanic, West, Low Franconian	22,000,000	24,000,000	Belgium, Netherlands	
Elfdalian	ovd	Indo-European, Germanic, North	2000			
Emilian	egl	Indo-European, Romance, Western, Gallo-Italic				
English	en	Indo-European, Germanic, West, Anglo-Frisian, Anglic	63,000,000	260,000,000	Ireland, Malta, United Kingdom	
Erzya	myv	Uralic, Finno-Ugric, Mordvinic	120,000			Mordovia (Russia)
Estonian	et	Uralic, Finno-Ugric, Finnic	1,165,400		Estonia	
Extremaduran	ext	Indo-European, Romance, Western, West Iberian	200,000			
Fala	fax	Indo-European, Romance, Western, West Iberian	11,000			
Faroese	fo	Indo-European, Germanic, North	66,150			Faroe Islands (Denmark)
Finnish	fi	Uralic, Finno-Ugric, Finnic	5,400,000		Finland	Sweden, Norway, Republic of Karelia (Russia)
Franco-Provençal (Arpitan)	frp	Indo-European, Romance, Western, Gallo-Romance	140,000			Aosta Valley (Italy)
French	fr	Indo-European, Romance, Western, Gallo-Romance, Oïl	81,000,000	210,000,000	Belgium, France, Luxembourg, Monaco, Switzerland, Jersey	Aosta Valley (Italy)
Frisian	fry frr stq	Indo-European, Germanic, West, Anglo-Frisian	470,000			Friesland (Netherlands), Schleswig-Holstein (Germany)
Friulan	fur	Indo-European, Romance, Western, Rhaeto-Romance	600,000			Friuli (Italy)
Gagauz	gag	Turkic, Oghuz	140,000			Gagauzia (Moldova)
Galician	gl	Indo-European, Romance, Western, West Iberian	2,400,000			Galicia (Spain), Eo-Navia (Asturias), Bierzo (Province of León) and Western Sanabria (Province of Zamora)
German	de	Indo-European, Germanic, West, High German	97,000,000	170,000,000	Austria, Belgium, Germany, Liechtenstein, Luxembourg, Switzerland	South Tyrol, Friuli-Venezia Giulia (Italy)
Godoberi	gin	Northeast Caucasian, Avar–Andic	130			
Greek	el	Indo-European, Hellenic	13,500,000		Cyprus, Greece	Albania (Finiq, Dropull)
Hinuq	gin	Northeast Caucasian, Tsezic	350			
Hungarian	hu	Uralic, Finno-Ugric, Ugric	13,000,000		Hungary	Burgenland (Austria), Vojvodina (Serbia), Romania, Slovakia, Subcarpathia (Ukraine), Prekmurje, (Slovenia)
Hunzib	bph	Northeast Caucasian, Tsezic	1,400			
Icelandic	is	Indo-European, Germanic, North	330,000		Iceland	
Ingrian	izh	Uralic, Finno-Ugric, Finnic	120			
Ingush	inh	Northeast Caucasian, Nakh	300,000			Ingushetia (Russia)
Irish	ga	Indo-European, Celtic, Goidelic	240,000	2,000,000	Ireland	Northern Ireland (United Kingdom)
Istriot	ist	Indo-European, Romance	900			
Istro-Romanian	ruo	Indo-European, Romance, Eastern	1,100			
Italian	it	Indo-European, Romance, Italo-Dalmatian	65,000,000	82,000,000	Italy, San Marino, Switzerland, Vatican City	Istria County (Croatia), Slovenian Istria (Slovenia)
Judeo-Italian	itk	Indo-European, Romance, Italo-Dalmatian	250			
Judaeo-Spanish (Ladino)	lad	Indo-European, Romance, Western, West Iberian	320,000	few		Bosnia and Herzegovina, France
Kabardian	kbd	Northwest Caucasian, Circassian	530,000			Kabardino-Balkaria & Karachay-Cherkessia (Russia)
Kaitag	xdq	Northeast Caucasian, Dargin	30,000			
Kalmyk	xal	Mongolic	80,500			Kalmykia (Russia)
Karata	kpt	Northeast Caucasian, Avar–Andic	260			
Karelian	krl	Uralic, Finno-Ugric, Finnic	36,000			Republic of Karelia (Russia)
Karachay-Balkar	krc	Turkic, Kipchak	300,000			Kabardino-Balkaria & Karachay-Cherkessia (Russia)
Kashubian	csb	Indo-European, Slavic, West, Lechitic	50,000			Poland
Kazakh	kk	Turkic, Kipchak	1,000,000		Kazakhstan	Astrakhan Oblast (Russia)
Khwarshi	khv	Northeast Caucasian, Tsezic	1,700			
Komi	kv	Uralic, Finno-Ugric, Permic	220,000			Komi Republic (Russia)
Kubachi	ugh	Northeast Caucasian, Dargin	7,000			
Kumyk	kum	Turkic, Kipchak	450,000			Dagestan (Russia)
Kven	fkv	Uralic, Finno-Ugric, Finnic	2,000-10,000			Norway
Lak	lbe	Northeast Caucasian, Lak	152,050			Dagestan (Russia)
Latin	la	Indo-European, Italic, Latino-Faliscan	extinct	few	Vatican City	
Latvian	lv	Indo-European, Baltic	1,750,000		Latvia	
Lezgin	lez	Northeast Caucasian, Lezgic	397,000			Dagestan (Russia)
Ligurian	lij	Indo-European, Romance, Western, Gallo-Italic	500,000		Monaco (Monégasque dialect is the "national language")	Liguria (Italy), Carloforte and Calasetta (Sardinia, Italy)
Limburgish	li lim	Indo-European, Germanic, West, Low Franconian	1,300,000 (2001)			Limburg (Belgium), Limburg (Netherlands)
Lithuanian	lt	Indo-European, Baltic	3,000,000		Lithuania	
Livonian	liv	Uralic, Finno-Ugric, Finnic	1	210	Latvia	
Lombard	lmo	Indo-European, Romance, Western, Gallo-Italic	3,600,000			Lombardy (Italy)
Low German (Low Saxon)	nds wep	Indo-European, Germanic, West	1,000,000	2,600,000		Schleswig-Holstein (Germany)
Ludic	lud	Uralic, Finno-Ugric, Finnic	300			
Luxembourgish	lb	Indo-European, Germanic, West, High German	336,000	386,000	Luxembourg	Wallonia (Belgium)
Macedonian	mk	Indo-European, Slavic, South, Eastern	1,400,000		North Macedonia	
Mainfränkisch	vmf	Indo-European, Germanic, West, High German, Upper	4,900,000			
Maltese	mt	Semitic, Arabic	520,000		Malta	
Manx	gv	Indo-European, Celtic, Goidelic	230	2,300		Isle of Man
Mari	chm mhr mrj	Uralic, Finno-Ugric	500,000			Mari El (Russia)
Meänkieli	fit	Uralic, Finno-Ugric, Finnic	40,000	55,000		Sweden
Megleno-Romanian	ruq	Indo-European, Romance, Eastern	3,000			
Minderico	drc	Indo-European, Romance, Western, West Iberian	500			
Mirandese	mwl	Indo-European, Romance, Western, West Iberian	15,000			Miranda do Douro (Portugal)
Moksha	mdf	Uralic, Finno-Ugric, Mordvinic	2,000			Mordovia (Russia)
Montenegrin	cnr	Indo-European, Slavic, South, Western, Serbo-Croatian	240,700		Montenegro	Mali Iđoš (Serbia)
Neapolitan	nap	Indo-European, Romance, Italo-Dalmatian	5,700,000			Campania (Italy)
Nenets	yrk	Uralic, Samoyedic	4,000			Nenets Autonomous Okrug (Russia)
Nogai	nog	Turkic, Kipchak	87,000			Dagestan (Russia)
Norman	nrf	Indo-European, Romance, Western, Gallo-Romance, Oïl	50,000			Guernsey (United Kingdom), Jersey (United Kingdom)
Norwegian	no	Indo-European, Germanic, North	5,200,000		Norway	
Occitan	oc	Indo-European, Romance, Western, Occitano-Romance	500,000			Catalonia (Spain) (Note: The Aranese dialect, in Val d'Aran county.)
Ossetian	os	Indo-European, Indo-Iranian, Iranian, Eastern	450,000			North Ossetia-Alania (Russia), South Ossetia
Palatinate German	pfl	Indo-European, Germanic, West, High German, Central	1,000,000			
Picard	pcd	Indo-European, Romance, Western, Gallo-Romance, Oïl	200,000			Wallonia (Belgium)
Piedmontese	pms	Indo-European, Romance, Western, Gallo-Italic	1,600,000			Piedmont (Italy)
Polish	pl	Indo-European, Slavic, West, Lechitic	38,500,000		Poland	
Portuguese	pt	Indo-European, Romance, Western, West Iberian	10,000,000		Portugal	
Rhaeto-Romance	fur lld roh	Indo-European, Romance, Western	370,000		Switzerland	Veneto Belluno, Friuli-Venezia Giulia, South Tyrol, & Trentino (Italy)
Ripuarian (Platt)	ksh	Indo-European, Germanic, West, High German, Central	900,000			
Romagnol	rgn	Indo-European, Romance, Western, Gallo-Italic				
Romani	rom	Indo-European, Indo-Iranian, Indo-Aryan, Western	1,500,000			Kosovo
Romanian	ro	Indo-European, Romance, Eastern	24,000,000	28,000,000	Moldova, Romania	Mount Athos (Greece), Vojvodina (Serbia)
Russian	ru	Indo-European, Slavic, East	106,000,000	160,000,000	Belarus, Kazakhstan, Russia	Mount Athos (Greece), Gagauzia (Moldova), Left Bank of the Dniester (Moldova), Ukraine
Rusyn	rue	Indo-European, Slavic, East	70,000			
Rutul	rut	Northeast Caucasian, Lezgic	36,400			Dagestan (Russia)
Sami	se	Uralic, Finno-Ugric	23,000		Norway	Sweden, Finland
Sardinian	sc	Indo-European, Romance	1,350,000			Sardinia (Italy)
Scots	sco	Indo-European, Germanic, West, Anglo-Frisian, Anglic	110,000			Scotland (United Kingdom), County Donegal (Republic of Ireland), Northern Ireland (United Kingdom)
Scottish Gaelic	gd	Indo-European, Celtic, Goidelic	57,000			Scotland (United Kingdom)
Serbian	sr	Indo-European, Slavic, South, Western, Serbo-Croatian	9,000,000		Bosnia and Herzegovina, Kosovo, Serbia	Croatia, Mount Athos (Greece), North Macedonia, Montenegro
Sicilian	scn	Indo-European, Romance, Italo-Dalmatian	4,700,000			Sicily (Italy)
Silesian	szl	Indo-European, Slavic, West, Lechitic	522,000			
Silesian German	sli	Indo-European, Germanic, West, High German, Central	11,000			
Slovak	sk	Indo-European, Slavic, West, Czech–Slovak	5,200,000		Slovakia	Vojvodina (Serbia), Czech Republic
Slovene	sl	Indo-European, Slavic, South, Western	2,100,000		Slovenia	Friuli-Venezia Giulia (Italy), Austria (Carinthia, Styria)
Sorbian (Wendish)	wen	Indo-European, Slavic, West	20,000			Brandenburg & Sachsen (Germany)
Spanish	es	Indo-European, Romance, Western, West Iberian	47,000,000	76,000,000	Spain	Gibraltar (United Kingdom)
Swabian German	swg	Indo-European, Germanic, West, High German, Upper, Alemannic	820,000			
Swedish	sv	Indo-European, Germanic, North	11,100,000	13,280,000	Sweden, Finland, Åland	
Swiss German	gsw	Indo-European, Germanic, West, High German, Upper, Alemannic	5,000,000		Switzerland (as German)	
Tabasaran	tab	Northeast Caucasian, Lezgic	126,900			Dagestan (Russia)
Tat	ttt	Indo-European, Iranian, Western	30,000			Dagestan (Russia)
Tatar	tt	Turkic, Kipchak	4,300,000			Tatarstan (Russia)
Tindi	tin	Northeast Caucasian, Avar–Andic	2,200			
Tsez	ddo	Northeast Caucasian, Tsezic	13,000			
Turkish	tr	Turkic, Oghuz	15,752,673		Turkey, Cyprus	Northern Cyprus
Udmurt	udm	Uralic, Finno-Ugric, Permic	340,000			Udmurtia (Russia)
Ukrainian	uk	Indo-European, Slavic, East	32,600,000		Ukraine	Left Bank of the Dniester (Moldova)
Upper Saxon	sxu	Indo-European, Germanic, West, High German, Central	2,000,000			
Vepsian	vep	Uralic, Finno-Ugric, Finnic	1,640			Republic of Karelia (Russia)
Venetian	vec	Indo-European, Romance, Italo-Dalmatian	3,800,000			Veneto (Italy)
Võro	vro	Uralic, Finno-Ugric, Finnic	87,000			Võru County (Estonia)
Votic	vot	Uralic, Finno-Ugric, Finnic	21			
Walloon	wa	Indo-European, Romance, Western, Gallo-Romance, Oïl	600,000			Wallonia (Belgium)
Walser German	wae	Indo-European, Germanic, West, High German, Upper, Alemannic	20,000			
Welsh	cy	Indo-European, Celtic, Brittonic	562,000	750,000		Wales (United Kingdom)
West-Flemish	vls	Indo-European, Germanic, West, Low Franconian	1,400,000			French Flanders (France)
Wymysorys	wym	Indo-European, Germanic, West, High German	70			
Yenish	yec	Indo-European, Germanic, West, High German	16,000			Switzerland
Yiddish	yi	Indo-European, Germanic, West, High German	600,000			Bosnia and Herzegovina, Netherlands, Poland, Romania, Sweden, Ukraine
Zeelandic	zea	Indo-European, Germanic, West, Low Franconian	220,000			

=== Languages spoken in Armenia, Azerbaijan, Cyprus, Georgia, and Turkey ===
There are various definitions of Europe, which may or may not include all or parts of Turkey, Cyprus, Armenia, Azerbaijan, and Georgia. For convenience, the languages and associated statistics for all five of these countries are grouped together on this page, as they are usually presented at a national, rather than subnational, level.

Name	ISO- 639	Classification	Speakers in expanded geopolitical Europe		Official status	
Name	ISO- 639	Classification	L1	L1+L2	National (Note: Sovereign states, defined as United Nations member states and observer states. 'Recognised minority language' status is not included.)	Regional
Abkhaz	ab	Northwest Caucasian, Abazgi	Abkhazia/Georgia: 191,000; Turkey: 44,000		Abkhazia	Abkhazia
Adyghe (West Circassian)	ady	Northwest Caucasian, Circassian	Turkey: 316,000			
Albanian	sq	Indo-European, Albanian	Turkey: 66,000 (Tosk)			
Arabic	ar	Afro-Asiatic, Semitic, West	Turkey: 2,437,000 Not counting post-2014 Syrian refugees			
Armenian	hy	Indo-European, Armenian	Armenia: 3 million Azerbaijan: 145,000; Georgia: around 0.2 million ethnic Armenians (Abkhazia: 44,870); Turkey: 61,000; Cyprus: 668		Armenia; Azerbaijan	Cyprus
Azerbaijani	az	Turkic, Oghuz	Azerbaijan 9 million Turkey: 540,000; Georgia 0.2 million		Azerbaijan	
Batsbi	bbl	Northeast Caucasian, Nakh	Georgia: 500			
Bulgarian	bg	Indo-European, Slavic, South	Turkey: 351,000			
Crimean Tatar	crh	Turkic, Kipchak	Turkey: 100,000			
Georgian	ka	Kartvelian, Karto-Zan	Georgia: 3,224,696; Turkey: 151,000; Azerbaijan: 9,192 ethnic Georgians		Georgia	
Greek	el	Indo-European, Hellenic	Cyprus: 679,883; Turkey: 3,600		Cyprus	
Juhuri	jdt	Indo-European, Indo-Iranian, Iranian, Southwest	Azerbaijan: 24,000 (1989)			
Kurdish	kur	Indo-European, Indo-Iranian, Iranian, Northwest	Turkey: 15 million Azerbaijan: 9,000			
Kurmanji	kmr	Indo-European, Indo-Iranian, Iranian, Northwest	Turkey: 8.13 million Armenia: 33,509; Georgia: 14,000			Armenia
Laz	lzz	Kartvelian, Karto-Zan, Zan	Turkey: 20,000; Georgia: 2,000			
Megleno-Romanian	ruq	Indo-European, Italic, Romance, East	Turkey: 4–5,000			
Mingrelian	xmf	Kartvelian, Karto-Zan, Zan	Georgia (including Abkhazia): 344,000			
Pontic Greek	pnt	Indo-European, Hellenic	Turkey: greater than 5,000; Armenia: 900 ethnic Caucasus Greeks; Georgia: 5,689 Caucasus Greeks			
Romani language and Domari language	rom, dmt	Indo-European, Indo-Iranian, Indic	Turkey: 500,000			
Russian	ru	Indo-European, Balto-Slavic, Slavic	Armenia: 15,000; Azerbaijan: 250,000; Georgia: 130,000	Armenia: about 0.9 million Azerbaijan: about 2.6 million Georgia: about 1 million Cyprus: 20,984	Abkhazia; South Ossetia	Armenia; Azerbaijan
Svan	sva	Kartvelian, Svan	Georgia (incl. Abkhazia): 30,000			
Tat	ttt	Indo-European, Indo-Aryan, Iranian, Southwest	Azerbaijan: 10,000			
Turkish	tr	Turkic, Oghuz	Turkey: 66,850,000; Cyprus: 1,405 + 265,100 in the North		Turkey; Cyprus; Northern Cyprus	
Zazaki	zza	Indo-European, Indo-Iranian, Iranian, Northwest	Turkey: 3–4 million (2009)			

== Immigrant communities ==
Recent (post–1945) immigration to Europe introduced substantial communities of speakers of non-European languages.

The largest such communities include Arabic speakers (see Arabs in Europe) and Turkish speakers (beyond European Turkey and the historical sphere of influence of the Ottoman Empire, see Turks in Europe). Armenians, Berbers, and Kurds have diaspora communities of c. 1–2,000,000 each. The various languages of Africa and languages of India form numerous smaller diaspora communities.

List of the largest immigrant languages

Name	ISO 639	Classification	Native	Ethnic diaspora
Arabic	ar	Afro-Asiatic, Semitic	5,000,000	Unknown
Turkish	tr	Turkic, Oghuz	3,000,000	7,000,000
Armenian	hy	Indo-European	1,000,000	3,000,000
Bengali	bn	Indo-European, Indo-Aryan	600,000	1,000,000
Kurdish	ku	Indo-European, Iranian, Western	600,000	1,000,000
Azerbaijani	az	Turkic, Oghuz	500,000	700,000
Kabyle	kab	Afro-Asiatic, Berber	500,000	1,000,000
Chinese	zh	Sino-Tibetan, Sinitic	300,000	2,000,000
Urdu	ur	Indo-European, Indo-Aryan	300,000	1,800,000
Uzbek	uz	Turkic, Karluk	300,000	2,000,000
Persian	fa	Indo-European, Iranian, Western	300,000	400,000
Punjabi	pa	Indo-European, Indo-Aryan	300,000	700,000
Gujarati	gu	Indo-European, Indo-Aryan	200,000	600,000
Tamil	ta	Dravidian	200,000	500,000
Somali	so	Afro-Asiatic, Cushitic	200,000	400,000

== See also ==
- Ethnic groups in Europe
- Eurolinguistics
- European Day of Languages
- Greek East and Latin West
- List of endangered languages in Europe
- List of multilingual countries and regions of Europe
- Standard Average European
- Travellingua

== Notes ==
By ISO 639-3 code
Enter an ISO code to find the corresponding language article.
