= Caucasian Sign Language =

Sign language formerly used among hearing Armenian women

- Armenian Woman's Sign Language
- հարսներէն
- Native to: Armenia
- Ethnicity: Armenians
- Extinct: (defunct)
- Language family: language isolate: Caucasian Sign Language

Language codes
- ISO 639-3: None (mis)
- Glottolog: arme1259

Armenian Woman's Sign Language, also known as Caucasian Sign Language or Harsneren (Armenian: հարսներէն, "bride's language"), is an indigenous sign language of Armenia. It is not directly related to the sign languages of Europe, though it may have historical connections to monastic sign language. It developed under marriage speech taboos similar to those operating in Aboriginal Australia (see Australian Aboriginal sign languages), and is now defunct.

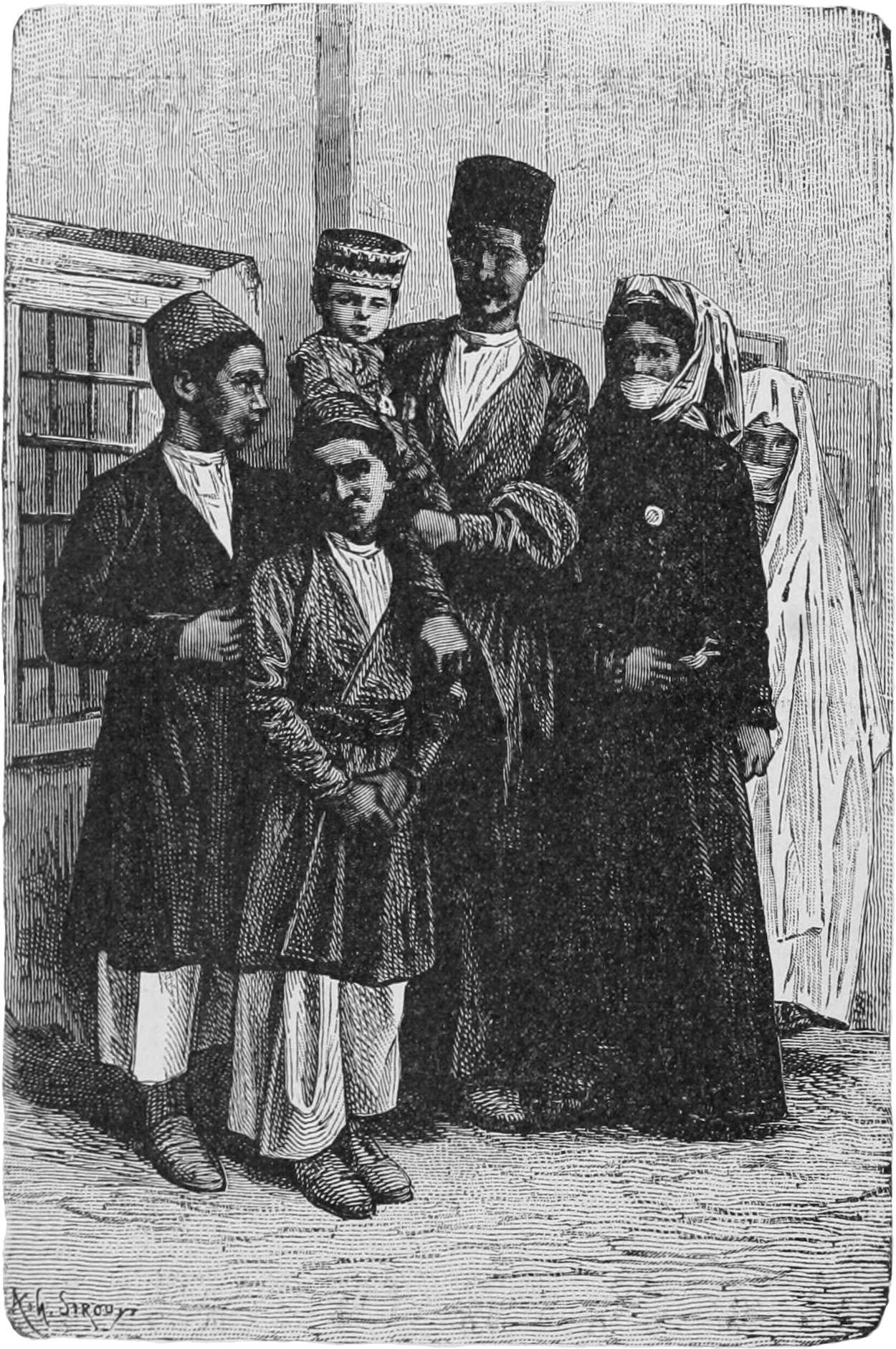
The women in this late-eighteen-hundreds family cover their mouths, a taboo associated with speech taboos.

Under the strict patriarchal society then existing in Armenia, a newly married woman was not allowed to speak in the presence of her husband, in-laws and certain other people. She could make simple communication using Harsneren. A study of the language took place in Tavush Province in the 1930s.

The deaf community now has its own sign language, known as Armenian Sign Language.

== See also ==
- Armenian language
- Languages of Armenia
- List of sign languages
