= Armenian Sign Language =

Deaf sign language of Armenia

- Հայերեն ժեստերի լեզու
- Native to: Armenia, Artsakh
- Signers: 3,200–16,000 (2008–2021)
- Language family: Language isolate

Language codes
- ISO 639-3: aen
- Glottolog: None

Armenian Sign Language (Armenian: Հայերեն ժեստերի լեզու, romanized: Hayeren zhesteri lezu) is the deaf sign language of Armenia.

== Classification ==
Wittmann (1991) posits that ArSL is a language isolate (a 'prototype' sign language).

== See also ==
- Armenian language
- Caucasian Sign Language
- Deafness
- Languages of Armenia
- Languages of Europe
- List of sign languages
- Sign language
