= Languages of Armenia =

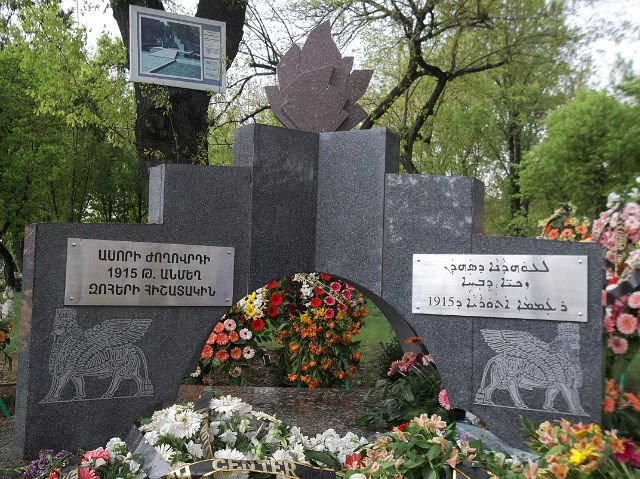
- Assyrian Genocide memorial in Yerevan, with plaques in Armenian and Assyrian
- Official: Armenian
- Minority: Assyrian, Greek, Russian, Kurdish (officially recognized by the ECRML)
- Foreign: Russian; English; French
- Signed: Armenian Sign Language
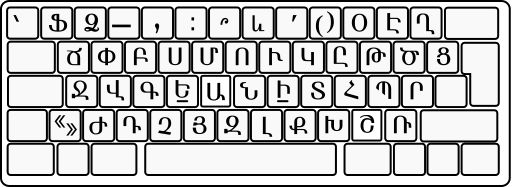
- Keyboard layout: Armenian keyboard

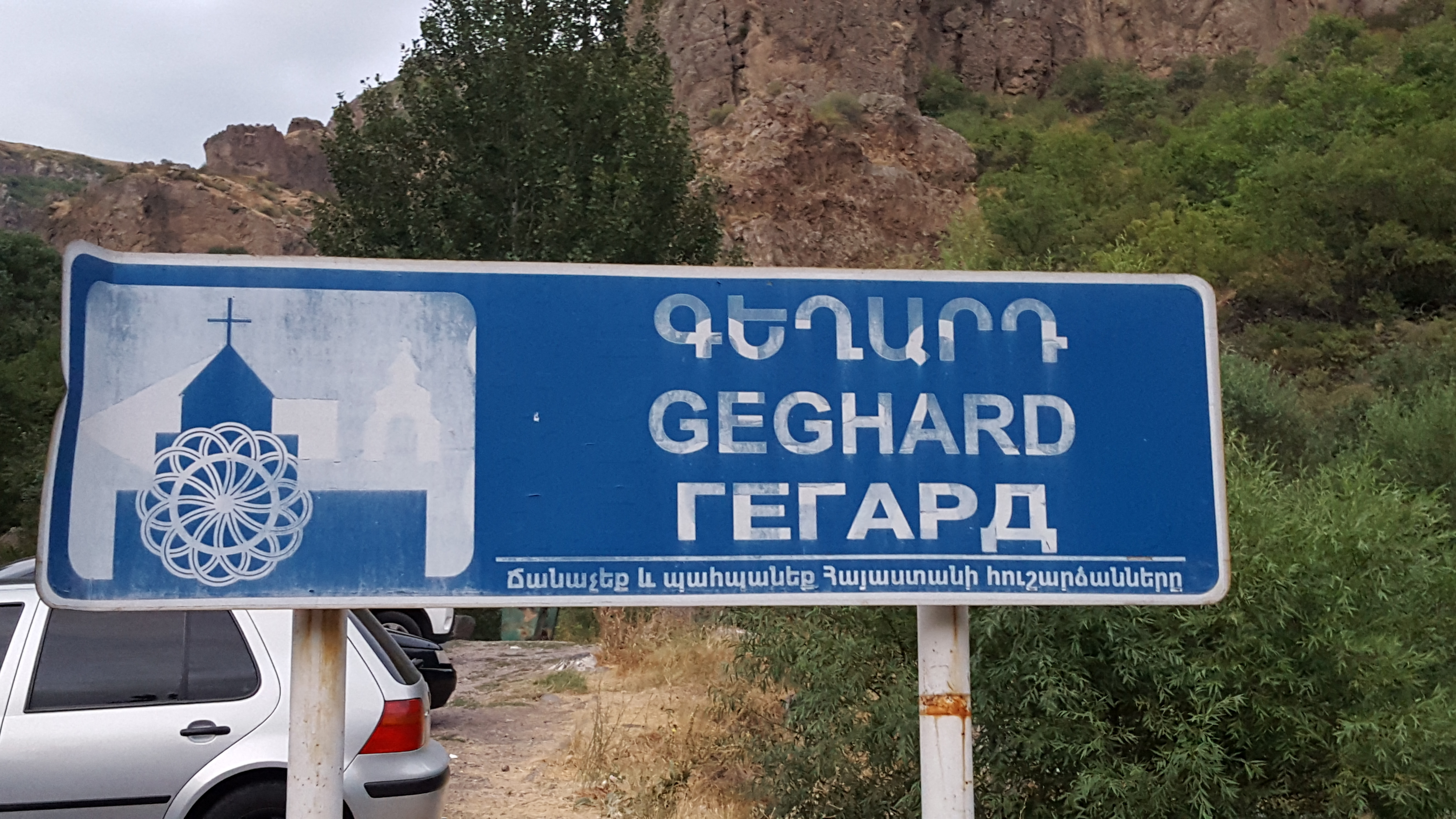
A multilingual (Armenian-English-Russian) sign at the Geghard monastery

Armenia is located in the Caucasus region of western Asia. Armenian is the official language in Armenia and is spoken as a first language by the majority of its population. Armenian is a pluricentric language with two modern standardized forms: Eastern Armenian and Western Armenian. Armenia's constitution does not specify the linguistic standard. In practice, the Eastern Armenian language dominates government, business, and everyday life in Armenia.

As of today, Russian is still, by far, the best known foreign language among the Armenian population. English is gaining popularity in recent years. French and several other languages have also begun to be studied and used. Kurmanji, spoken by the Yazidi minority, is the largest minority language of Armenia. Other minority languages recognized by the Armenian government are Assyrian, Greek, and Russian.

== Status of Armenian ==
The Article 20 of the Constitution of Armenia states that "The state language of the Republic of Armenia is Armenian".

Armenian is a major language used in education, administration and public life. Armenian belongs to an independent branch of the Indo-European language family and uses a unique 36-letter alphabet invented in the 5th century, which since the early 20th century contains 39 letters.

Armenia has been the most successful of the three South Caucasian states (others being Azerbaijan and Georgia) in linguistic de-Russification after the collapse of the Soviet Union.

== Foreign languages ==
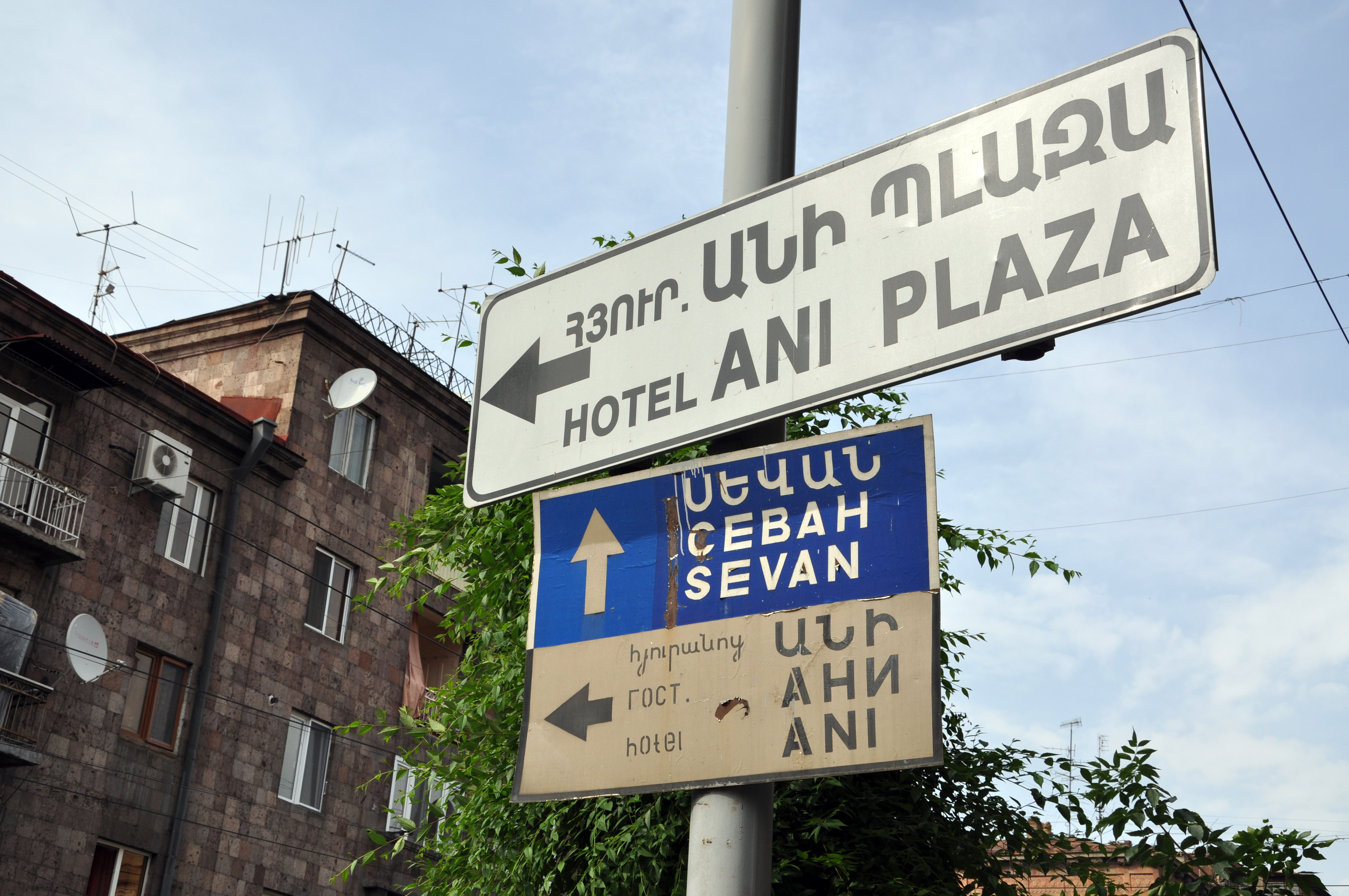
Most Soviet-era street signs in Yerevan are in Armenian, Russian and (sometimes) English, while most post-Soviet signs are in Armenian and English

Russian is the most common foreign language and is spoken by the majority of Armenians. Knowledge of English is growing in Armenia.

There are universities in Russian, English and French in the capital of Armenia, Yerevan. Study courses are available in numerous languages in Armenian universities, most notably the Yerevan State Linguistic University.

=== Russian ===
Armenian-Russian bilingualism in Soviet Armenia
Year	Armenian SSR	Rural	Urban	Yerevan
1970	23.3%	9.5%	31.6%	36.5%
1979	34.2%	17.7%	41.7%	47.5%

Russian is by far the most common foreign language in Armenia. Although its level of competence has significantly decreased since Armenia's independence in 1991, in 2010, the Russian Ministry of Foreign Affairs has reported that about 70% of Armenia's population has the ability to speak Russian. A 1999 study showed that about 40% of the population is fluent in Russian. Russian language television stations (four as of 2003) and newspapers are widely available in Armenia. A 2012 opinion poll showed that 94% of Armenians have at least basic knowledge of Russian, with 24% having advanced knowledge, 59% intermediate knowledge and 11% having beginner level knowledge.

The whole area of the modern Republic of Armenia was annexed by the Russian Empire in the early 19th century. Since then Russian has been of high significance in the life and history of Armenia. Basically, from 1828 to 1918 and from 1921 to 1991 all official nomenclature was done in Russian, because it was the administrative language of those periods. In the early 20th century, it was estimated that only 3-4% of Armenians could read or speak Russian.

Rapid Russification started during the Soviet period, particularly after Stalin's coming to power in the mid-1930s, when Russian became lingua franca of the Soviet Union. Until 1990 the Russian language was widely applied alongside Armenian. In 1988, nearly 100,000 Armenian students within the republic attended Russian-language schools. Russian was the main language of academic research, although Armenia's constitution has recognized Armenian as the official language. By the 1980s over 90% of Armenia's administrative paperwork was conducted in Russian. A large number of Armenian intelligentsia members sent their children to Russian-language schools, which was considered to be harmful to the future of Armenian.

Since 1991 the situation changed radically, in concern of studying it at secondary and high school as a general subject. In practice, almost at all educational institutions the process of teaching was performed in Armenian, even at Russian departments of colleges and universities. Thus, the Russian language lost its statute of a second mother tongue and was classified as a foreign language. All these factors brought forth changes of the language functioning structure in real time conditions. The absolute number of students of the Russian language was significantly decreased.

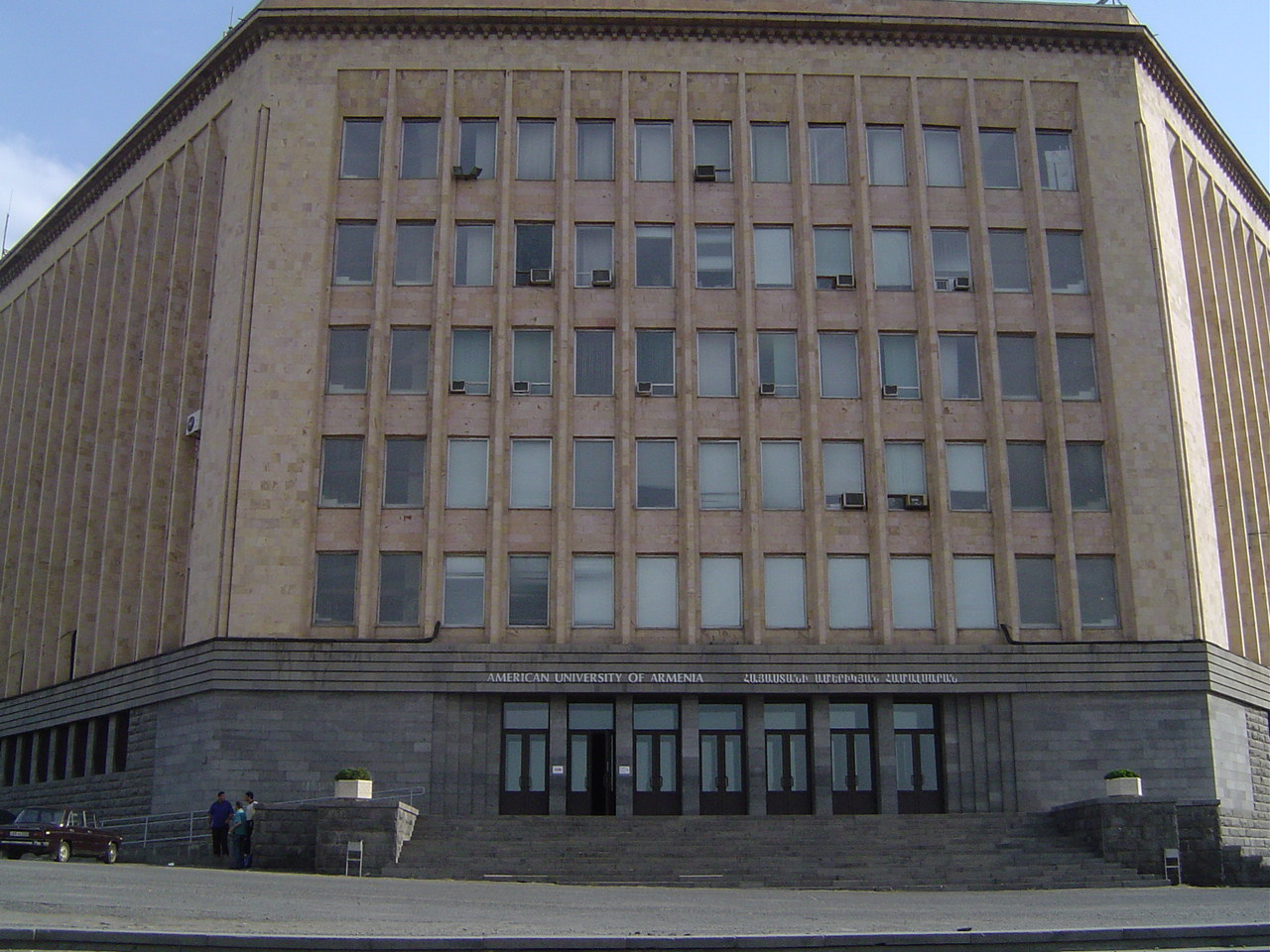
The American University of Armenia

The 2001 census revealed 29,563 people with Russian as their native language, from which 14,728 were ethnic Armenians. Many Armenian refugees from Baku and other cities of Azerbaijan speak only Russian.

According to The Gallup Organization's poll, 73% of Armenians in 2006 and 75% in 2007 said that they think it is very important for children in the country to learn Russian.

According to the 2011 Armenian Census 23,484 people or 0.8% of Armenia's citizens spoke Russian as their first language, 11,859 of the speakers were Armenians, 10,472 speakers were Russians, and the other 1,153 were of other ethnicities. In addition to those who speak Russian as a first language, 1,591,246 people or 52.7% of Armenia's citizens speak Russian as a second language.

Since 2022, the Russian language undoubtedly experienced a surge/revival as over 100,000 Russians have indefinitely settled in Armenia following the start of the partial mobilization for the Russian invasion of Ukraine.

=== English ===
The popularity of English has been growing since Armenia's independence in 1991. From year to year, more people tend to learn the English language. In contrast to the last decades, the number of Armenian schools teaching English have grown gradually. English is still far behind Russian in terms of knowledge among Armenians. According to a 2012 poll, 40% of Armenians have basic knowledge of English with only 4% having advanced proficiency of English, 16% intermediate and 20% beginner level. However, in recent years, English has proven slightly more preferable than Russian. 50% of Armenians think that English should be taught in public secondary schools compared to 44% preferring Russian.

CNN started broadcasting on a regular basis in Armenia in 2002. The Times is available at kiosks.

The American University of Armenia, an affiliate of the University of California, was established in 1991 and offers instruction leading to a master's degree in eight fields of study and teaching English as a foreign language. By offering these programs in English, AUA strives to become accessible to qualified individuals from other countries in the region.

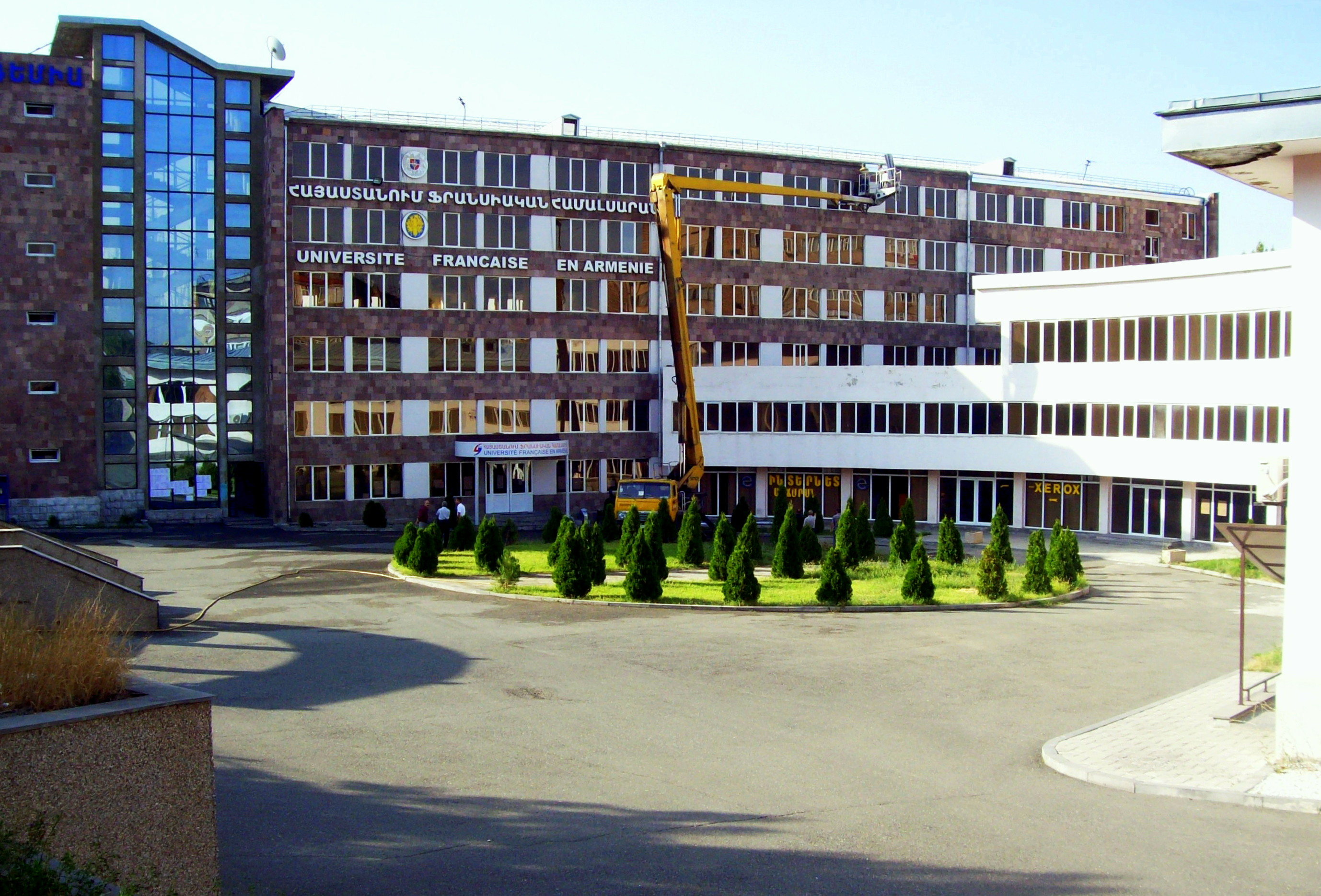
The French University in Armenia

According to the 2011 Armenian Census 107,922 Armenian citizens or 3.6% of Armenia's population can speak English as a second language. 107,002 of the English-second language speakers are ethnic Armenians, the other 920 are of other ethnicities.

=== Other ===
Other foreign languages common in Armenia include French, German, Italian, and Spanish. Since 2008, Armenia is an associate member of the Francophonie and became its full member in October 2012. A university named Fondation Université Française en Arménie (French University in Armenia) was founded in 2000 according to the agreement between the Armenian and French governments. With 600 students, the UFAR is the largest French university in a non-French speaking country.

According to the 2011 Armenian census, there are 10,106 people who speak French as a second language (10,056 of the speakers are ethnic Armenians), 6,342 people who speak German as a second language (6,210 of the speakers are ethnic Armenians), 4,396 speakers of Persian (4,352 of the speakers are ethnic Armenians), and 29,430 people speak other languages as a second language (25,899 of the speakers are ethnic Armenians). Many Armenians speak Azerbaijani as a second language, since the country welcomed 370,000 Armenian refugees from Azerbaijan, including the former Nagorno Karabakh Autonomous Oblast during the Nagorno Karabakh War, which lasted from 1988–1994.

== Minority languages ==
Armenian joined the European Charter for Regional or Minority Languages in 2001, which protects the languages of the minorities: Assyrian, Greek, Russian and Northern Kurdish.

=== Kurdish ===
Yazidis are the largest minority in Armenia. According to the 2001 census 40,620 people identified themselves as Yazidis and 1,519 as Kurds. The same source showed 31,310 people with Kurdish as their native language.

According to the 2011 Armenian Census, there were 37,403 Kurds (35,272 Yazidis and 2,131 non-Yazidi Kurds) in Armenia. 33,509 of Armenia's citizens speak Kurdish as a first language (31,479 reported Yazidi while 2,030 reported Kurdish). 32,688 of the speakers were ethnic Kurds, while the other 821 Kurdish-language speakers were non-Kurds (777 were ethnic Armenians).

=== Russian ===
The 2001 census revealed 29,563 people with Russian as their native language, from which 12,905 were ethnic Russians.

According to the 2011 Armenian Census, there were 11,862 Russians in Armenia, 10,472 of them speak Russian as a first language, the other 1,390 Russians speak other languages as their first language (1,328 Russians speak Armenian as a first language). Other than ethnic Russians, 13,012 non-Russians speak Russian as a first language (11,859 of them are ethnic Armenians and the other 1,153 Russian speakers are of other ethnicities. In addition to those who speak Russian as a first language, 1,591,246 people or 52.7% of Armenia's citizens speak Russian as a second language.

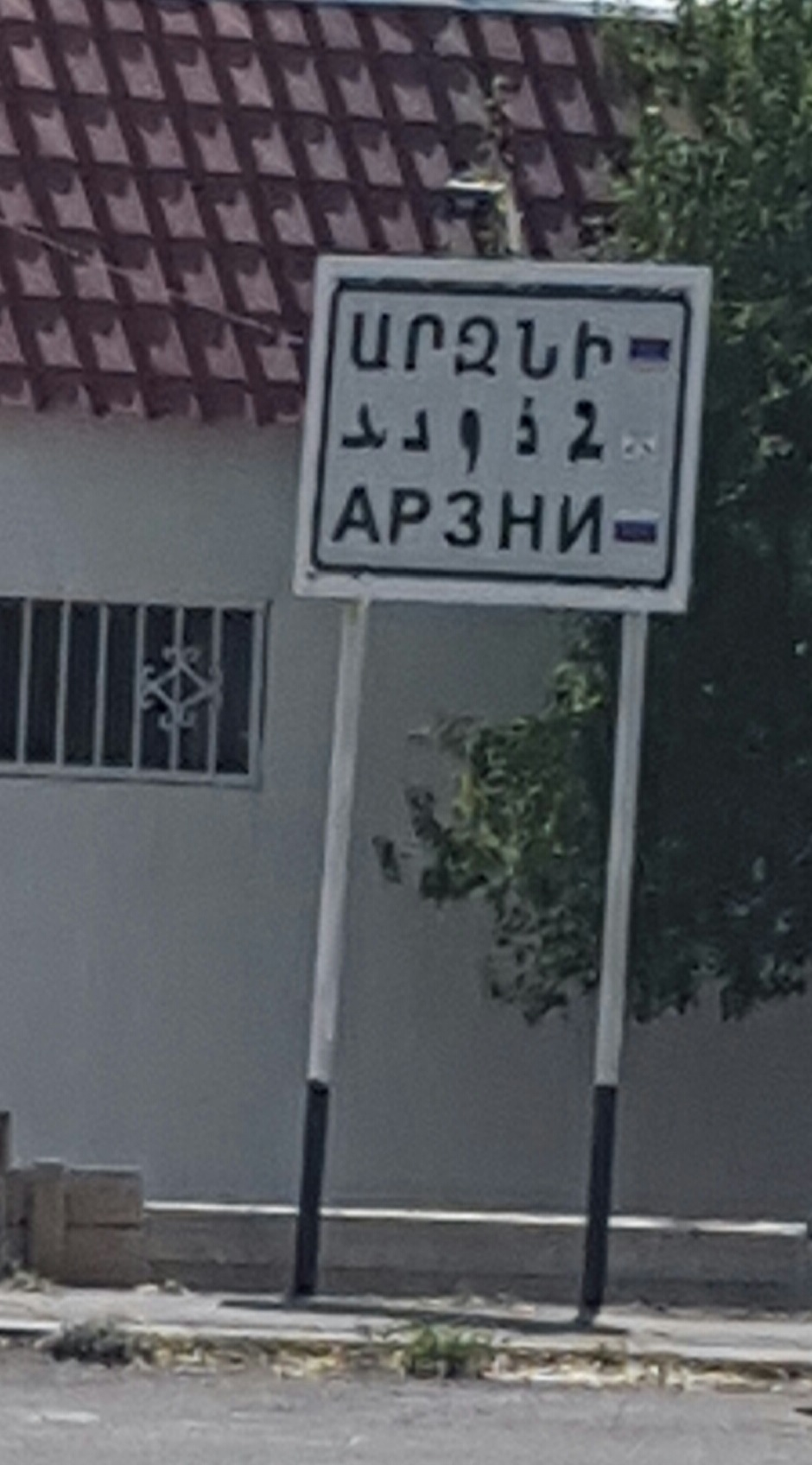
A multilingual (Armenian, Assyrian, Russian) sign at the entrance of Arzni.

=== Assyrian ===
Assyrian Neo-Aramaic is spoken by the 3,000-strong Assyrian minority of Armenian.

According to the 2011 Armenian Census there were 2,769 Assyrians in Armenia. There are 2,402 people who speak Assyrian Neo-Aramaic as a first language, 2,265 of the speakers are ethnic Assyrians, while the other 137 speakers are of other ethnicities (125 are ethnic Armenians).

=== Ukrainian ===
According to the 2011 Armenian Census there are 1,176 Ukrainians in Armenia. There are 733 people who speak Ukrainian as a first language in Armenia, 606 of them are ethnic Ukrainians, the other 127 Ukrainian speakers are of other ethnicities (106 of them are ethnic Armenians).

=== Greek ===
Although Armenian Greeks are mostly multilingual (speaking Greek, Armenian and Russian), the 1,176 strong Greek community has kept the Pontic Greek dialect as their native language.

According to the 2011 Armenian Census there are 900 Greeks in Armenia. In the 1970s the Greek community of Armenia numbered 6,000, but many emigrated to Greece, especially after the fall of the Soviet Union in 1991. Like other small communities, the Greeks of Armenia speak mostly Russian, though many especially of the older generation have the ability to speak Pontic Greek, a Greek dialect, native to the southern shore of the Black Sea (the Black Sea Region of modern-day Turkey). The 2011 Armenian Census did not cite the number of people who speak Greek as a first language, though it can be known that it is no more than 733, because Ukrainian was the language with the fewest speakers reported.

=== Lomavren ===
Lomraven is spoken by the Lom minority.

== Historical languages ==
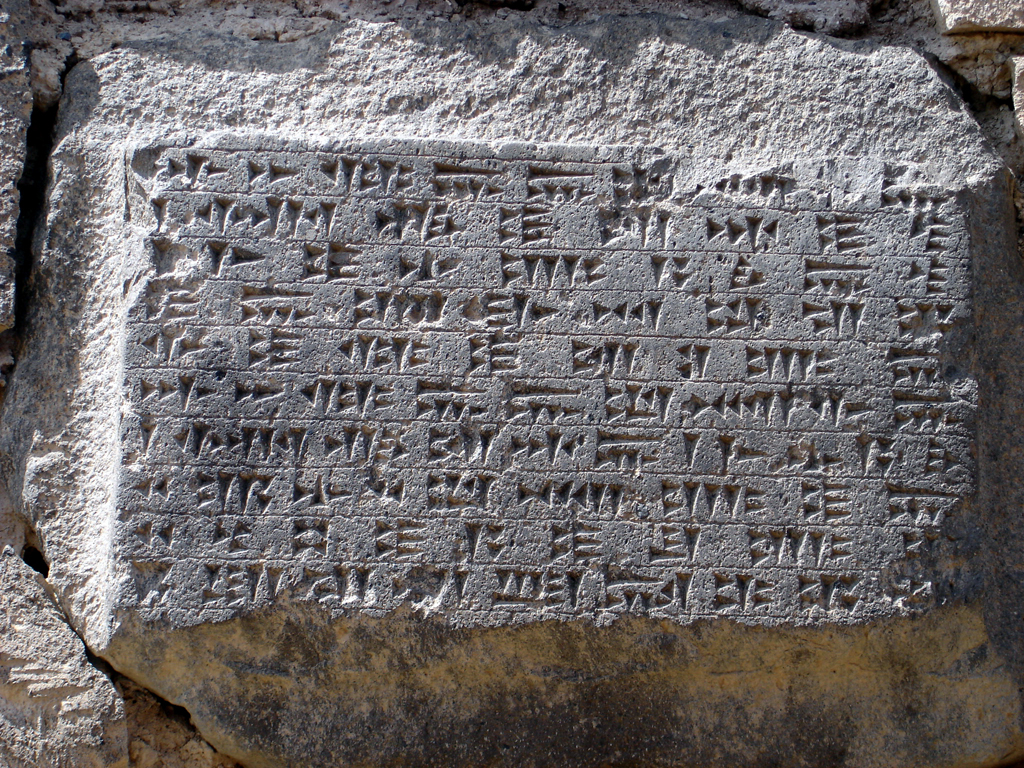
The "birth certificate" of Yerevan in Erebuni Fortress - a cuneiform inscription left by King Argishti I of Urartu on a basalt stone slab about the foundation of the city in 782 BC.

The first language that was recorded to be spoken in the Armenian Highland is the Hurrian language, which was spoken in the Mitanni and parts of the Armenia from around 2300 BC and had mostly vanished by 1000 BC. The Urartian language followed and was spoken by the inhabitants of the ancient kingdom of Urartu that was located in the region of Lake Van, with its capital near the site of the modern city of Van in the Armenian Highland, modern-day Turkey. It is argued on linguistic evidence that proto-Armenian came in contact with Urartian at an early date (3rd-2nd millennium BC), before the formation of the Urartian kingdom. It was probably spoken by the majority of the population around Lake Van and in the areas along the upper Zab valley. First attested in the 9th century BCE, Urartian ceased to be written after the fall of the Urartian state in 585 BCE, and presumably it became extinct due to the fall of Urartu. Some speculate it have been replaced by an early form of Armenian, although it is only in the fifth century CE that the first written examples of Armenian appear.

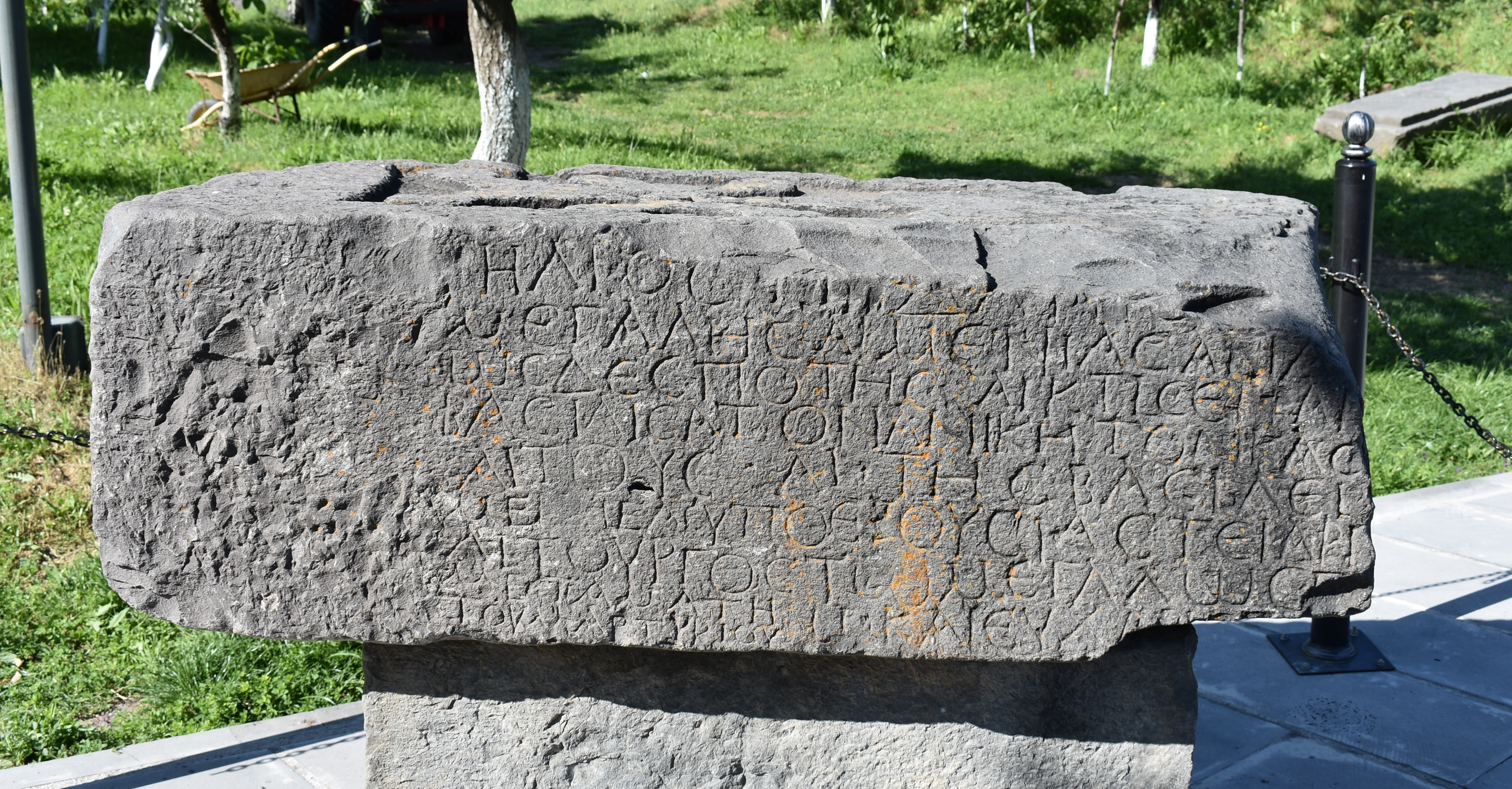
Greek inscription erected in Garni by Tiridates I, 1st century AD

Though Armenian is generally recognized as a separate branch of the Indo-European family, Armenia was considered to be part of the Persian language by western scholars until the 1870s when it was recognized as a separate Indo-European language. Greek and Syriac were the languages of the Armenian Apostolic Church from the day of its creation (301 AD) to 405 AD, when Mesrop Mashtots invented the Armenian alphabet.

According to the 1897 Russian census top languages spoken in the Erivan Governorate, partially corresponding to the current territory of Armenia, were Armenian (441,000), Turkic (referred to as Tatar prior to 1918; 313,176), Kurdish (49,389), Russian (13,173), Assyrian (2,865), Ukrainian (2,682), Polish (1,385), Greek (1,323), Jewish (not specified, mostly Yiddish; 850), Tat (709), Georgian (566).
