= Travellingua =

- Location: European Union
- Founder: European Commission
- Established: on 1 November 2006 until 30 September 2008
- Website: www.travellingua.eu

Travellingua, also known as the Language and Culture Explorers' Club, is a project which was supported by the European Commission under the Socrates Lingua 1 (Promotion of Language Learning) action. The project was implemented from November 1, 2006 to September 30, 2008.

== Website ==
The official website is split into 5 main sections:

1. LEARN: A linguistic section with written and audio materials in 5 languages (English, Lithuanian, Latvian, Danish and Swedish).
2. EXPLORE: a section providing basic information about 4 countries, their cultures and languages (Lithuania, Latvia, Denmark and Sweden).
3. SHARE: a section where the written and audio materials can be downloaded. Learners may also upload their knowledge and experience in language learning and traveling within this section.
4. CONSULT: a linguistic section where any learner can ask a general question about language learning or a specific language (Lithuanian, Latvian, Danish or Swedish) and get a professional answer from a linguist. Answers then are posted for the general public.
5. CONTINUE STUDIES: a section providing useful links for those who decide to continue self-studying Lithuanian, Latvian, Danish or Swedish, or those wishing to find more information about traveling.

== Project members ==
=== Project coordinator ===
Eurolingvija Training center
Sauliu str. 21, LT-92233, Klaipeda, Lithuania
www.eurolingvija.eu

=== Project partners ===
Forbundet Kommunikation og Sprog (The Union of Communication and Language Professionals)
Forbundet Kommunikation og Sprog, Skindergade 45–47, Postboks 2246, 1019 København K
www.kommunikationogsprog.dk

Videnscenter for Integration (Resource Center For Integration)
Havneparken 2, DK-7100, Vejle, Denmark
www.vifin.dk

Mittuniversitetet (Mid Sweden University)
S-871 88 Härnösand, Sweden
www.miun.se

Klaipėdos Turizmo ir Kultūros Informacijos Centras (Klaipeda Tourism and Culture Information Center)
Turgaus g. 7, LT-91247, Klaipėda, Lithuania
www.klaipedainfo.lt

== See also ==
Multilingualism
