= Monastic sign languages =

Gestural communication used by Christian monks

Monastic Sign
- Region: Europe
- Native speakers: None
- Language family: (sign lexicons)
- Dialects: Anglo-Saxon; Augustinian; Benedictine; Cistercian

Language codes
- ISO 639-3: mzg
- Glottolog: mona1241

Monastic sign languages have been used in Europe from at least the tenth century by Christian monks, and some, such as Cistercian and Trappist sign, are still in use today—not only in Europe, but also in China, Japan, and the United States. Unlike deaf sign languages, they are better understood as forms of symbolic gestural communication rather than languages, and some writers have preferred to describe them as sign lexicons.

== Uses ==
The purposes for which these sign lexicons were used were varied. Travelling Franciscan friars used finger alphabets, possibly as memory aids for preaching, and in Benedictine monasteries, signs representing words were used for limited communication when silence was required. Rather than the popularly imagined total "Vows of Silence", the Rule of St. Benedict merely prohibits conversation in certain areas of the monastery during certain hours of the day. The most common time for silence was known as the "Great Silence" which took place at night. It was only much later, in the seventeenth century, that reform movements within the Cistercian and Trappist communities came to see absolute silence as a valuable penance along with other austere, yet voluntary, deprivations.

== Signs ==
Signs are well documented in medieval Benedictine monasteries of Western Europe, from Portugal to England. Antique texts present lists of words with accompanying signs, including instructions for sign production. Occasionally they also explain the rationale behind the sign. Signs are mostly nouns relating to monastic life. Foods, articles of clothing, particular rooms and buildings, ritual objects, and different ranks of clerical office dominate the vocabulary. The few signs that act as verbs include "sit", "stand up", "kneel", and "confess". They almost always bear an iconic or visually motivated connection to the thing represented by the sign. No grammar is described for these signs, and they were probably used in the word order of an oral language—either Latin or the local vernacular—and possibly with accompanying gesture such as pointing. Modern Cistercian monks in England or the United States use a syntax derived "heavily, but not exclusively", from English, while Cistercian monks in France loosely follow the syntax of the French language; at least as much as it is possible to do so, given the limited lexicon. Vocabulary lists in the medieval texts ranged from 52 signs to 472, with "the average at 178 and a mean at 145."

The earliest Benedictine sign books date from around 1075 (and again at about 1083) at the Abbey of Cluny (in what is now France), and Hirsau Abbey (in what is now Germany) at around the same time. Bonaventure in the thirteenth century used a finger alphabet, and the medieval Monasteriales Indicia describes 127 signs used by Anglo-Saxon Benedictine monks. Signs from a sixteenth century Portuguese monastic sign language have also been documented.

== List ==
- Benedictine sign language
  - (Cluny dialect)
- Anglo-Saxon monastic sign language (defunct)
- Augustinian Sign Language = Canons Sign Language (defunct)
  - Dublin Cathedral (defunct)
  - Ely Cathedral (defunct)
  - Paris (defunct)
- Trappist Sign Language
- Cistercian Sign Language
