= Altounyan =

Altounyan, Altunyan, Altounian, and Altonian (Armenian: Ալթունյան; Western Armenian: Ալթունեան) is a common Armenian surname. It can refer to:

== Altounyan ==
- Roger Altounyan (1922–1987), Anglo-Armenian physician and pharmacologist

== Altunyan ==
- Ruben Altunyan (1939–2021), Armenian composer
- Tatul Altunyan (1901–1973), Armenian conductor

== Altounian ==
- David Altounian, entrepreneur and businessman
- Essaï Altounian (born 1980), French-Armenian singer, songwriter, keyboardist, music producer and an actor
- Joe Altounian, American-Armenian entrepreneur and businessman
- Levon Altounian (1936–2020), Lebanese-Armenian footballer

== See also ==
- Altun
