= Itsirakh =

Itsirakh Ицирах
- Selo
- Location within Republic of Dagestan Location within Russia
- Coordinates: 42°14′N 45°50′E
- Country: Russia
- Region: Republic of Dagestan
- District: Tsuntinsky District
- Time zone: UTC+3:00

Itsirakh (Russian: Ицирах) is a rural locality (a selo) in Tsuntinsky District, Republic of Dagestan, Russia. Population: 171 (2021 census); 76 (2002 census); 67 (1989 Soviet census). There is 1 street in this selo.

== Geography ==
Selo is located 158 km from Makhachkala (capital of Dagestan) and 1,648 km from Moscow. Chalyakh is the nearest rural locality.
