= Shalakho =

Dance in the Caucasus

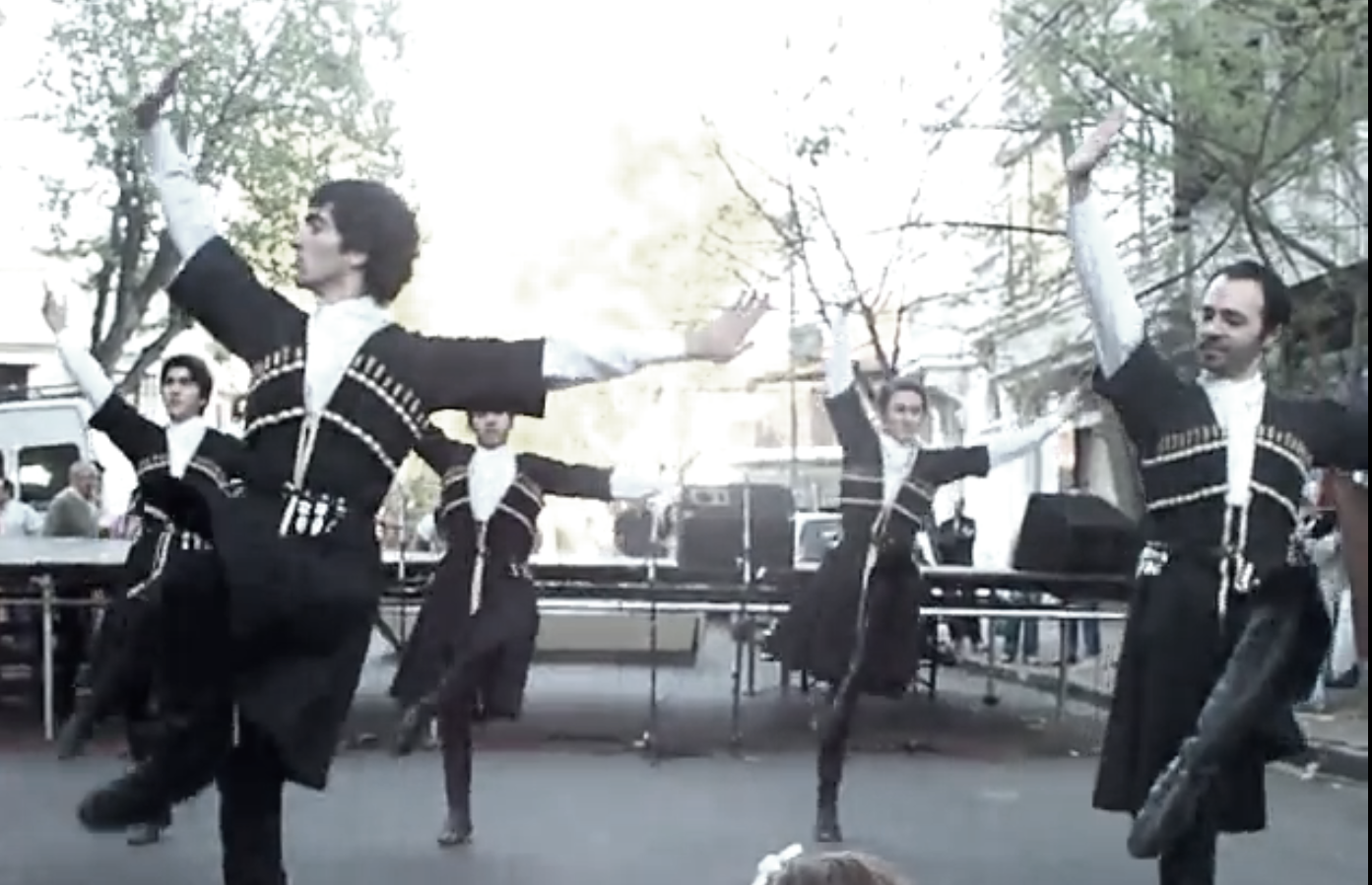
- Shalakho dance performed by an Armenian dance ensemble "Masis", based in Argentina
- Native name: Armenian: շալախո or շալախոյ Azerbaijani: Şalaxo, Şələxo, Şələqoy or Şələküm; Bezhta: Шалахо; Georgian: შალახო, კინტოური or ბაღდადური Hunzib: Шалахо; Tsakhur: Шалахо
- Etymology: Unknown
- Genre: Folk dance
- Time signature: 6/8
- Tempo: allegro, allegro moderato
- Instrument(s): barrel organ, clarinet, accordion, garmon, duduk, balaban, zurna
- Inventor: South Caucasus
- Origin: Caucasus

Shalakho (/ʃæləˈkoʊ/ sha-luh-KHAW) (Note: Armenian: շալախո, romanized: Shalakho or Armenian: շալախոյ, romanized: Shalakhoi; Azerbaijani: Şalaxo; pronounced [ʃɑɫɑχˈɔ], Azerbaijani: Şələxo; pronounced [ʃæɫæχˈɔ], Azerbaijani: Şələqoy; pronounced [ʃæɫæˈɡoj] or Azerbaijani: Şələküm; pronounced [ʃæɫæˈcym]; Bezhta: шалахо, romanized: šalaxo; Georgian: შალახო, romanized: Shalakho; Georgian pronunciation: [ʃaɫaχo], Georgian: კინტოური, romanized: K'int'ouri; Georgian pronunciation: [kʼintʼouɾi] or Georgian: ბაღდადური, romanized: Baghdaduri; Georgian pronunciation: [bɑɣdɑduɾi]; Hunzib: шалахо, romanized: šalaxo; Tsakhur: шалахо, romanized: shalakho) is a folk dance performed throughout all of the Caucasus. It's distinguished by its 6/8 time signature and fast-paced, upbeat style.

Azerbaijani Shalakho
First cover of Shalakho dance in Azerbaijani style.

Azerbaijani Shalakho 2
Second cover of Shalakho dance in Azerbaijani style.

Armenian Shalakho
A cover of Shalakho dance in Armenian style.

== Name ==
=== Armenian sources ===
- Per Karine Hayrapetyan, from Pan-Armenian International Academy of Sciences the name Shalakho (Armenian: շալախո) derives from Shalakhoi (Armenian: Շալախոյ) with the y-semi-vowel falling. She further argues, that the name is related to the Armenian totems and the Shirak Plain. Additionally, she draws a parallel between the name and the word shalax (Armenian: շալախ, lit. 'apricot, precocious').

=== Georgian sources ===
- In Georgian the term Kintouri (Georgian: კინტოური, romanized: K'int'ouri, lit. 'Kintoian') is equivalent to kinto (Georgian: კინტო, romanized: K'int'o, lit. 'kinto, the entertainers who lived in Tbilisi') + -uri (Georgian: ური, romanized: -uri, lit. '-ian'). The term is used interchangeably with Shalakho (Georgian: შალახო, romanized: Shalakho) and Baghdaduri (Georgian: ბაღდადური, romanized: baghdaduri, lit. 'Baghdadian').
- The Georgian term Baghdaduri (Georgian: ბაღდადური, romanized: baghdaduri, lit. 'Headscarfian') is equivalent to baghdad (Georgian: ბაღდად, romanized: baghdad, lit. 'headscarf') + -uri (Georgian: ური, romanized: -uri, lit. '-ian'). The term is used interchangeably with Shalakho (Georgian: შალახო, romanized: Shalakho) and Kintouri (Georgian: კინტოური, romanized: K'int'ouri, lit. 'Kintoian').

=== Azerbaijani sources ===
- Per Azerbaijani composer Afrasiyab Badalbeyli, in his Explanatory Monographic Musical Dictionary (Azerbaijani: İzahlı Monoqrafik musiqi lüğəti) the term Shalakho derives from Shalakum (Azerbaijani: Şələküm), which is an elision of the phrase shala yukum (Azerbaijani: şələ yüküm, lit. '(my) heavy load').
- Azerbaijani philologist Aliheydar Orucov, in his Explanatory Dictionary of Azerbaijani Language (Azerbaijani: Azərbaycan Dilinin İzahlı Lüğəti) marks the word as a Georgian loanword.
- According to Aynur Talıbova, in her Get Closer To Azerbaijan (Azerbaijani: Azərbaycana daha yaxın olaq) the name Shalakho owes its origin to the moment when clowns and entertainers in Zaqatala would put a piece of wood on an animal's back during their performance, thus alluding to a bundle of logs, then singing a song where lyrics contained multiple use of the word shala (Azerbaijani: şələ, lit. 'a burden, load').
- For the name Shalaqoy (Azerbaijani: Şələqoy) compare Azerbaijani phrase shalani qoy, gal doyushak (Azerbaijani: şələni qoy, gəl döyüşək, lit. 'put your burden, let's fight'), which could have influenced it.

=== Other languages ===
- Bezhta term shalakho (Bezhta: шалахо, romanized: šalaxo), Hunzib term shalakho (Hunzib: шалахо, romanized: šalaxo) and Tsakhur term shalakho (Tsakhur: шалахо, romanized: shalakho) are thought to be a borrowed from Georgian.

== History ==
The Shalakho dance developed in the urban centers of the South Caucasus, particularly in Tiflis (now Tbilisi), which in the 19th century was an important cultural hub with a significant Armenian population active in music and dance. The city was ethnically diverse, and various communities participated in public performances and entertainment, including Shalakho performed with duduk, barrel organ, and other popular instruments. In this cultural environment, Shalakho was performed by local musicians and dancers, with the majority being of Armenian origin.

These performances were part of popular urban entertainment, often including comedic acts and animal displays, such as bears or monkeys. The performing groups were ethnically mixed, including Romani entertainers.

=== In records ===
The melody was first recorded and arranged for piano by the Armenian composer Nikoghayos Tigranyan in 1895 and was published later in 1900.

In 1937, Azerbaijani composer Said Rustamov would publish the notation of the Shalakho dance in his Azerbaijani Dance Melodies

Since 1938 the dance has been a part of a repertoire of Tatul Altunyan's Armenian National Song and Dance Ensemble (Armenian: Հայկական ժողովրդական երգի-պարի անսամբլ, romanized: Haykakan zhoghovrdakan yergi-pari ansambl).

The dance was performed in a 1940 Azerbaijani ballet Maiden Tower (Azerbaijani: Qız Qalası) by Afrasiyab Badalbeyli. In 1942, it was performed in an Armenian ballet called Gayane (Armenian: Գայանե, romanized: Gayane) by Aram Khachaturian.

Music Notations

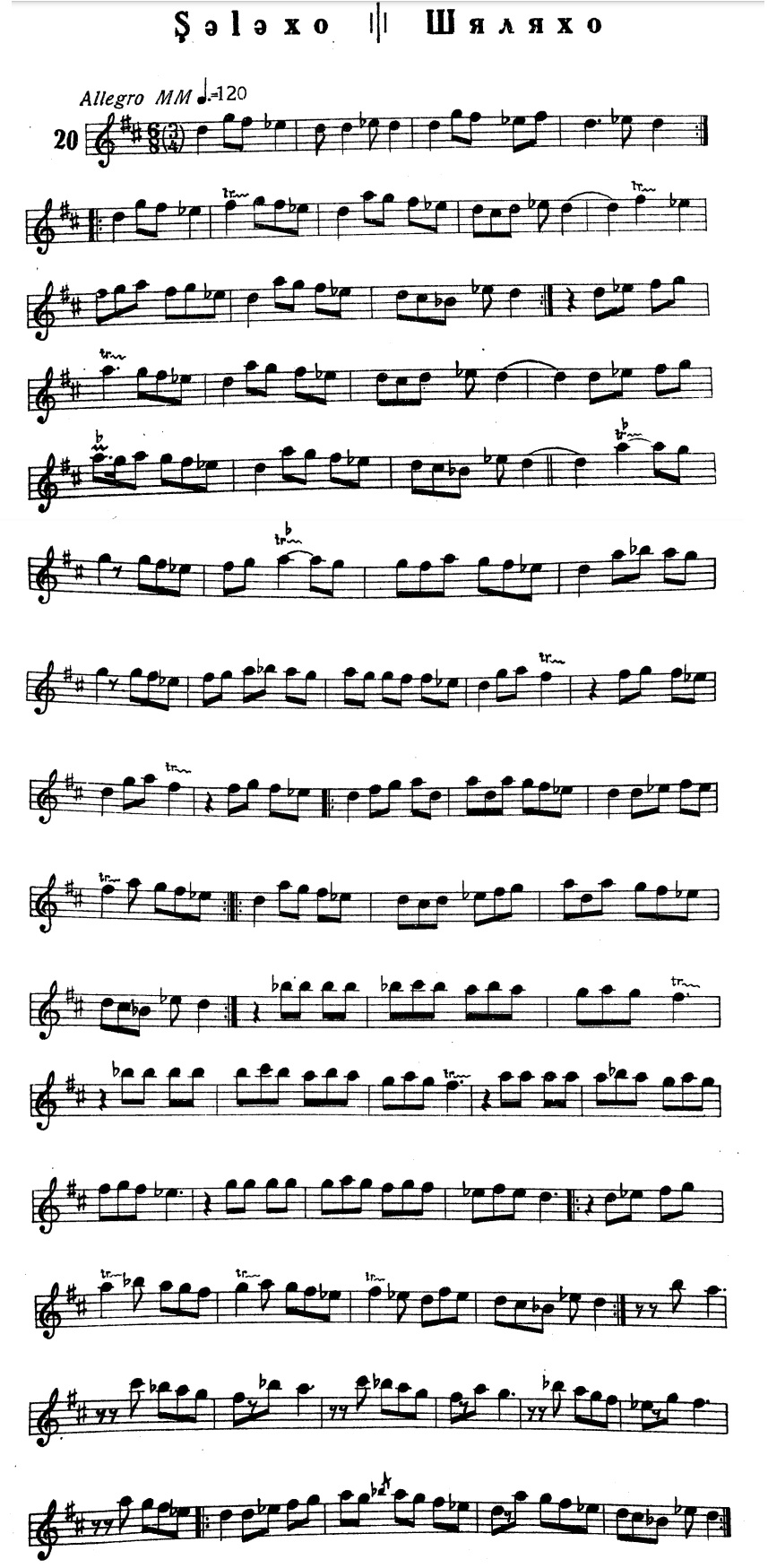
Notation of the dance from Said Rustamov's «Azerbaijani Dance Melodies» (Baku, 1937)

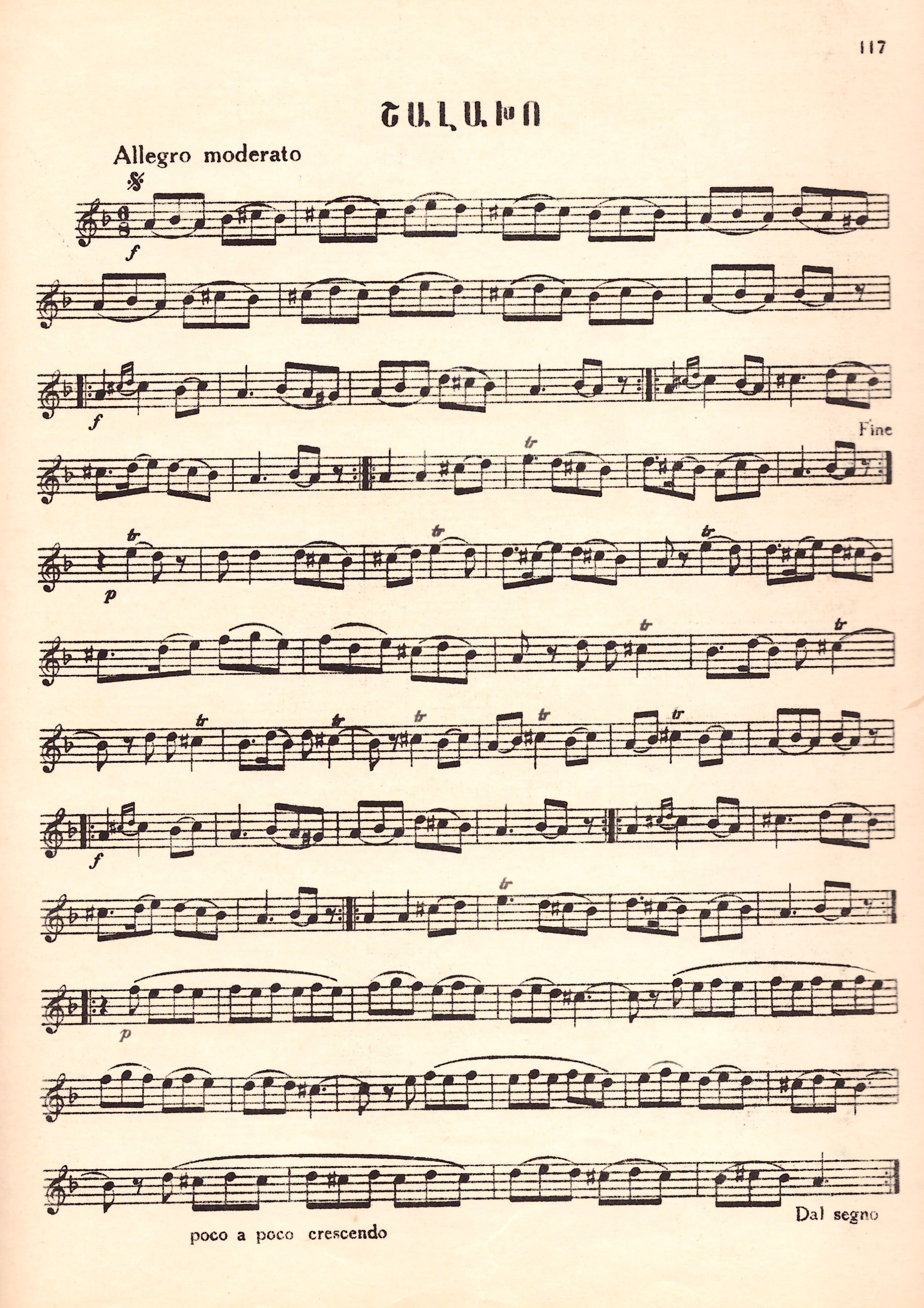
Notation of the dance in Tatul Altunyan's «Armenian folk dances and melodies» (Yerevan, 1958)

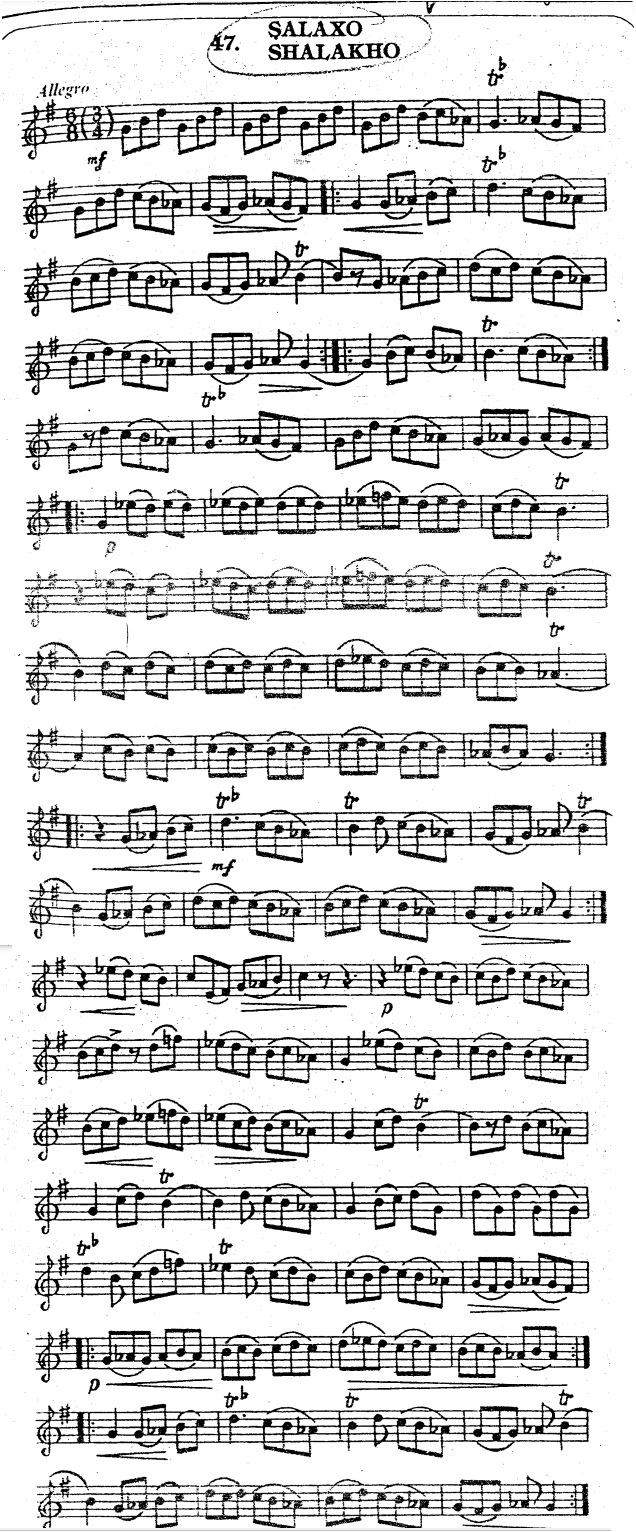
Notation of the dance from «Azerbaijani Folk Dances» (Baku, 2002)

== Performance ==
In a broadly spread version, two men dance in order to win the favour of a woman. The dance can be performed by one or more dancers, men or women, in a free, Caucasian style of performance. Motions of women can be slow and lyrical. Music of the dance is rapid, which is reflected in the expansive and energetic motions of men.

== See also ==
- Lezginka, a collective name for Caucasian dances.
- Uzundara, a dance performed by Armenians and Azerbaijanis.
- Kochari, a dance performed by Armenians, Azerbaijanis and Georgians.
- Sari Gelin, a dance performed by Armenians and Azerbaijanis
