= Tsokhok =

Tsokhok Цохок
- Selo
- Location within Republic of Dagestan Location within Russia
- Coordinates: 42°14′N 46°03′E
- Country: Russia
- Region: Republic of Dagestan
- District: Tsuntinsky District
- Time zone: UTC+3:00

Tsokhok (Russian: Цохок) is a rural locality (a selo) in Tsuntinsky District, Republic of Dagestan, Russia. Population: 102 (2021 census); 78 (2002 census); 73 (1989 Soviet census).

== Geography ==
Selo is located 160 km from Makhachkala (capital of Dagestan) and 1,643 km from Moscow. Udok is the nearest rural locality.
