= Hunzib =

Hunzib may refer to:

- Hunzib people: An indigenous people of the Caucasus
- Hunzib language: Their language
