= Khamaitli =

Khamaitli Хамаитли
- Selo
- Location within Republic of Dagestan Location within Russia
- Coordinates: 42°18′N 45°57′E
- Country: Russia
- Region: Republic of Dagestan
- District: Tsuntinsky District
- Time zone: UTC+3:00

Khamaitli (Russian: Хамаитли) is a rural locality (a selo) in Tsuntinsky District, Republic of Dagestan, Russia. Population: 43 (2021 census); 44 (2002 census); 312 (1989 Soviet census). There is 1 street in this selo.

== Geography ==
Selo is located 146 km from Makhachkala (capital of Dagestan) and 1,645 km from Moscow. Khebatli is the nearest rural locality.
