= Khenokh =

Khenokh Хенох
- Selo
- Location within Republic of Dagestan Location within Russia
- Coordinates: 42°15′N 45°58′E
- Country: Russia
- Region: Republic of Dagestan
- District: Tsuntinsky District
- Time zone: UTC+3:00

Khenokh (Russian: Хенох) is a rural locality (a selo) in Tsuntinsky District, Republic of Dagestan, Russia. Population: 10 (2021 census); 16 (2002 census); 11 (1989 Soviet census). There is 1 street in this selo.

== Geography ==
Selo is located 148 km from Makhachkala (capital of Dagestan) and 1,650 km from Moscow. Khetokh is the nearest rural locality.
