= Kituri =

Kituri Китури
- Selo
- Location within Republic of Dagestan Location within Russia
- Coordinates: 42°14′N 46°01′E
- Country: Russia
- Region: Republic of Dagestan
- District: Tsuntinsky District
- Time zone: UTC+3:00

Kituri (Russian: Китури) is a rural locality (a selo) in Tsuntinsky District, Republic of Dagestan, Russia. Population: 604 (2021 census); 331 (2002 census); 250 (1989 Soviet census). There is 1 street in this selo.

== Geography ==
Selo is located 146 km from Makhachkala (capital of Dagestan) and 1,654 km from Moscow. Geniyatl is the nearest rural locality.
