= Gutatli =

Gutatli Гутатли
- Selo
- Location within Republic of Dagestan Location within Russia
- Coordinates: 42°12′N 45°56′E
- Country: Russia
- Region: Republic of Dagestan
- District: Tsuntinsky District
- Time zone: UTC+3:00

Gutatli (Russian: Гутатли) is a rural locality (a selo) in Tsuntinsky District, Republic of Dagestan, Russia. Population: 297 (2021 census); 276 (2002 census); 202 (1989 Soviet census). There is 1 street in this selo.

== Geography ==
Selo is located 154 km from Makhachkala (capital of Dagestan) and 1,655 km from Moscow. Zekhida is the nearest rural locality.
