= Khora, Republic of Dagestan =

Khora Хора
- Selo
- Location within Republic of Dagestan Location within Russia
- Coordinates: 42°15′N 45°48′E
- Country: Russia
- Region: Republic of Dagestan
- District: Tsuntinsky District
- Time zone: UTC+3:00

Khora (Russian: Хора) is a rural locality (a selo) in Tsuntinsky District, Republic of Dagestan, Russia. Population: 34 (2021 census); 24 (2002 census); 14 (1989 Soviet census). There is 1 street in this selo.

== Geography ==
Selo is located 159 km from Makhachkala (capital of Dagestan) and 1,645 km from Moscow. Asakh is the nearest rural locality.
