= Shaitli =

Shaitli Шаитли
- Selo
- Location within Republic of Dagestan Location within Russia
- Coordinates: 42°14′N 46°03′E
- Country: Russia
- Region: Republic of Dagestan
- District: Tsuntinsky District
- Time zone: UTC+3:00

Shaitli (Russian: Шаитли) is a rural locality (a selo) in Tsuntinsky District, Republic of Dagestan, Russia. Population: 646 (2021 census); 546 (2002 census); 372 (1989 Soviet census). There is 1 street in this selo.

== Geography ==
Selo is located 144 km from Makhachkala (capital of Dagestan) and 1,655 km from Moscow. Geniyatl is the nearest rural locality.
