= Hinukh =

Hinukh (or alternatively Hinuq, Hinux, Ginukh, or Ginux) could refer to:

- Hinuq language
- Hinukh people
- Genukh, the village where the Hinukh live
