= Khibiyatl =

Khibiyatl Хибиятль
- Selo
- Location within Republic of Dagestan Location within Russia
- Coordinates: 42°14′N 46°03′E
- Country: Russia
- Region: Republic of Dagestan
- District: Tsuntinsky District
- Time zone: UTC+3:00

Khibiyatl (Russian: Хибиятль) is a rural locality (a selo) in Tsuntinsky District, Republic of Dagestan, Russia. Population: 150 (2021 census); 132 (2002 census); 115 (1989 Soviet census).

== Geography ==
Selo is located 159 km from Makhachkala (capital of Dagestan) and 1,655 km from Moscow. Vitsiyatl is the nearest rural locality.
