= Kidero =

Kidero can mean

- Kidero (rural locality), a rural locality in Dagestan, Russia
- Evans Kidero, a Kenyan politician
