= Khebatli =

Khebatli Хебатли
- Selo
- Location within Republic of Dagestan Location within Russia
- Coordinates: 42°16′N 45°55′E
- Country: Russia
- Region: Republic of Dagestan
- District: Tsuntinsky District
- Time zone: UTC+3:00

Khebatli (Russian: Хебатли) is a rural locality (a selo) in Tsuntinsky District, Republic of Dagestan, Russia. Population: 460 (2021 census); 355 (2002 census); 271 (1989 Soviet census). There are 3 streets in this selo.

== Geography ==
Selo is located 150 km from Makhachkala (capital of Dagestan) and 1,647 km from Moscow. Shauri is the nearest rural locality.
