= Khupri =

Khupri Хупри
- Selo
- Location within Republic of Dagestan Location within Russia
- Coordinates: 42°12′N 45°50′E
- Country: Russia
- Region: Republic of Dagestan
- District: Tsuntinsky District
- Time zone: UTC+3:00

Khupri (Russian: Хупри) is a rural locality (a selo) in Tsuntinsky District, Republic of Dagestan, Russia. Population: 732 (2021 census); 495 (2002 census); 422 (1989 Soviet census). There are 6 streets in this selo.

== Geography ==
Selo is located 161 km from Makhachkala (capital of Dagestan) and 1,652 km from Moscow. Kitlyarta is the nearest rural locality.
