= Tlyatsuda =

Tlyatsuda Тляцуда
- Selo
- Location within Republic of Dagestan Location within Russia
- Coordinates: 42°20′N 45°55′E
- Country: Russia
- Region: Republic of Dagestan
- District: Tsuntinsky District
- Time zone: UTC+3:00

Tlyatsuda (Russian: Тляцуда) is a rural locality (a selo) in Tsuntinsky District, Republic of Dagestan, Russia. Population: 410 (2021 census); 363 (2002 census); 280 (1989 Soviet census). There are 3 streets in this selo.

== Geography ==
Selo is located 146 km from Makhachkala (capital of Dagestan) and 1,639 km from Moscow. Mitluda is the nearest rural locality.
