= Mitluda =

Mitluda Митлуда
- Selo
- Location within Republic of Dagestan Location within Russia
- Coordinates: 42°22′N 45°56′E
- Country: Russia
- Region: Republic of Dagestan
- District: Tsuntinsky District
- Time zone: UTC+3:00

Mitluda (Russian: Митлуда) is a rural locality (a selo) in Tsuntinsky District, Republic of Dagestan, Russia. Population: 15 (2021 census); 57 (2002 census); 71 (1989 Soviet census). There is 1 street in this selo.

== Geography ==
Selo is located 144 km from Makhachkala (capital of Dagestan) and 1,638 km from Moscow. Tlyatsuda is the nearest rural locality.
