= Terutli =

Terutli Терутли
- Selo
- Location within Republic of Dagestan Location within Russia
- Coordinates: 42°17′N 45°47′E
- Country: Russia
- Region: Republic of Dagestan
- District: Tsuntinsky District
- Time zone: UTC+3:00

Terutli (Russian: Терутли) is a rural locality (a selo) in Tsuntinsky District, Republic of Dagestan, Russia. Population: 361 (2021 census); 201 (2002 census); 148 (1989 Soviet census). There is 1 street in this selo.

== Geography ==
Selo is located 159 km from Makhachkala (capital of Dagestan) and 1,641 km from Moscow. Makhalotli is the nearest rural locality.
