= Kimyatli =

Kimyatli Кимятли
- Selo
- Location within Republic of Dagestan Location within Russia
- Coordinates: 42°14′N 45°49′E
- Country: Russia
- Region: Republic of Dagestan
- District: Tsuntinsky District
- Time zone: UTC+3:00

Kimyatli (Russian: Кимятли) is a rural locality (a selo) in Tsuntinsky District, Republic of Dagestan, Russia. Population: 524 (2021 census); 221 (2002 census); 171 (1989 Soviet census). There is 1 street in this selo.

== Geography ==
Selo is located 159 kilometres (99 mi) from Makhachkala (capital of Dagestan) and 1,647 kilometres (1,023 mi) from Moscow. Retlob is the nearest rural locality.
