= Zekhida =

Zekhida Зехида
- Selo
- Location within Republic of Dagestan Location within Russia
- Coordinates: 42°11′N 45°56′E
- Country: Russia
- Region: Republic of Dagestan
- District: Tsuntinsky District
- Time zone: UTC+3:00

Zekhida (Russian: Зехида) is a rural locality (a selo) in Tsuntinsky District, Republic of Dagestan, Russia. Population: 273 (2021 census); 398 (2002 census); 277 (1989 Soviet census). There are 2 streets in this selo.

== Geography ==
Selo is located 154 km from Makhachkala (capital of Dagestan) and 1,656 km from Moscow. Kidero is the nearest rural locality.
