= Genukh =

Genukh Генух
- Selo
- Location within Republic of Dagestan Location within Russia
- Coordinates: 42°10′N 45°59′E
- Country: Russia
- Region: Republic of Dagestan
- District: Tsuntinsky District
- Time zone: UTC+3:00

Genukh (Russian: Генух) is a rural locality (a selo) in Tsuntinsky District, Republic of Dagestan, Russia. Population: 699 (2021 census); 461 (2002 census); 391 (1989 Soviet census). There is 1 street in this selo.

== Geography ==
Selo is located 153 km from Makhachkala (capital of Dagestan) and 1,660 km from Moscow. Kidero is the nearest rural locality.
