= Kinto =

Georgian entertainer

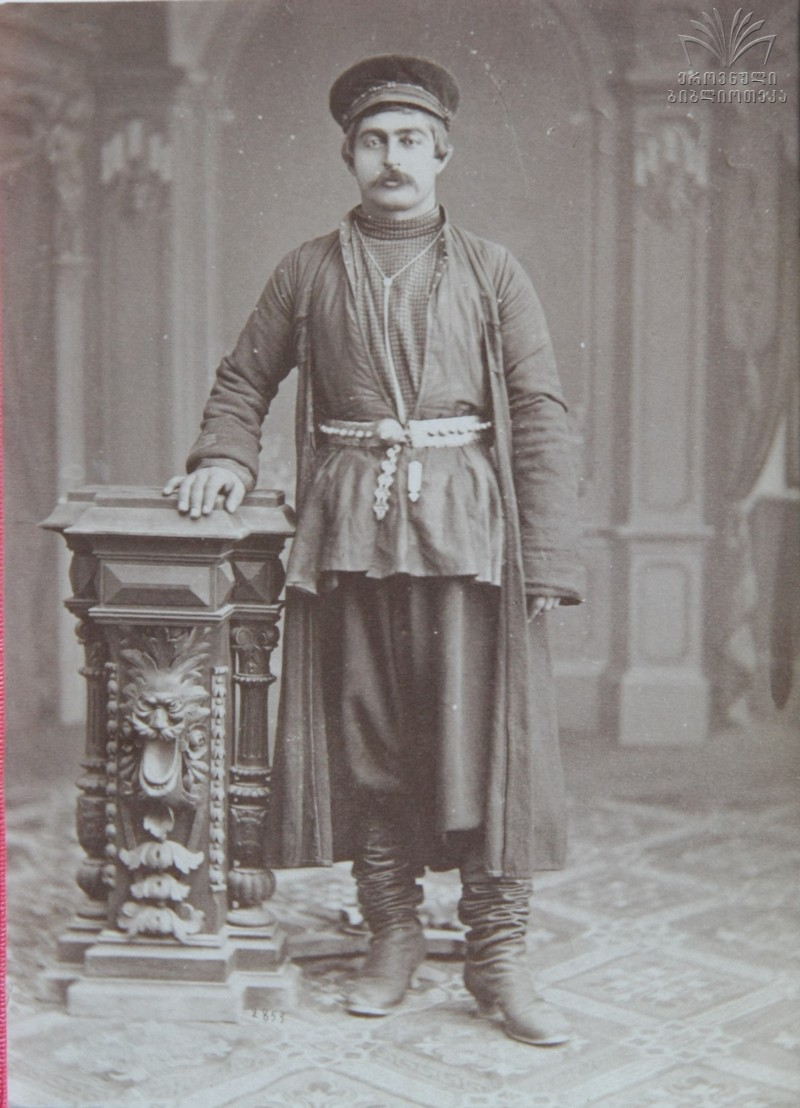
A Tbilisian kinto, photo by Dmitri Yermakov

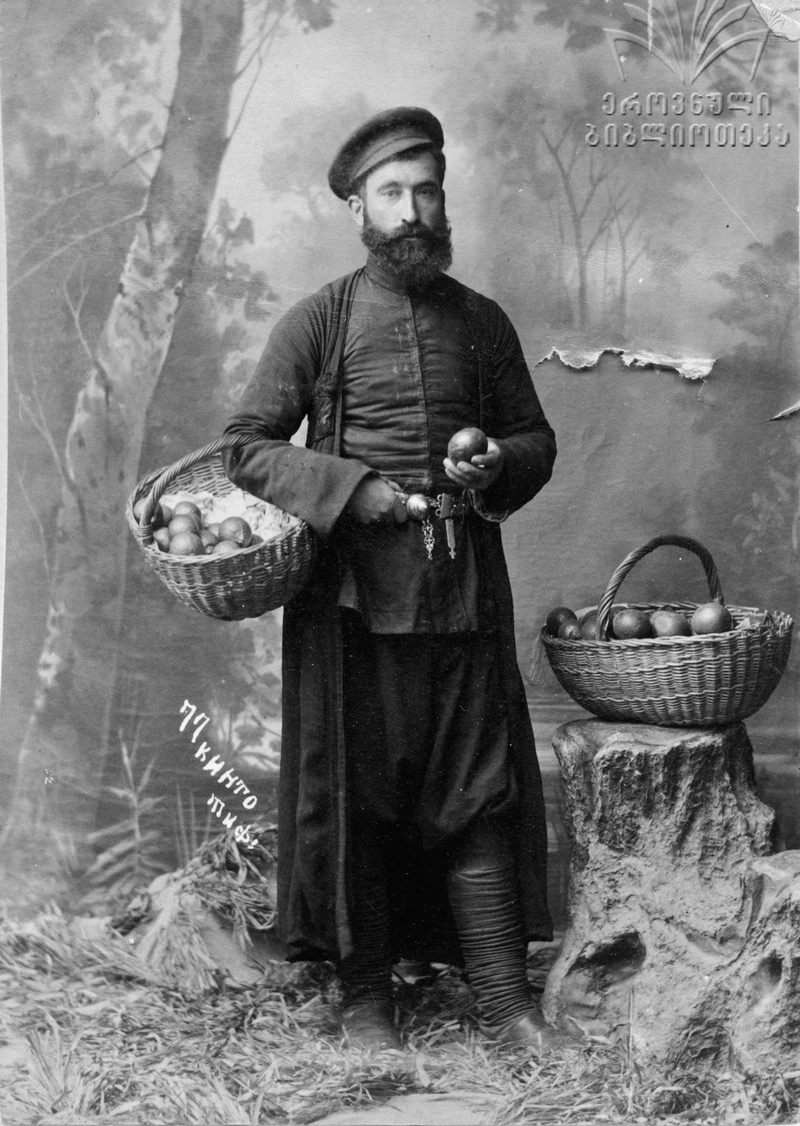
A kinto in a photo by Alexander Roinashvili

A kinto (Georgian: კინტო) was a trader or an unemployed person mostly occupied in entertaining others in Georgian dukans (taverns), popular in Tbilisi in the 19th century and early in the 20th century.

The Georgian Kintouri (or kintauri) dance in based on the character of the kintos, and portrays them as cunning, swift, and informal. The dance is light-natured and fun to watch.

Recent research suggests that homosexuality was common among the kinto community and tolerated by the mainstream society, which did not care about the lives of these marginalized peoples. The kinto thus became a symbol of the Tbilisi Pride movement.
