= Chaatli =

Chaatli Чаатли
- Selo
- Location within Republic of Dagestan Location within Russia
- Coordinates: 42°15′N 45°49′E
- Country: Russia
- Region: Republic of Dagestan
- District: Tsuntinsky District
- Time zone: UTC+3:00

Chaatli (Russian: Чаатли) is a rural locality (a selo) in Tsuntinsky District, Republic of Dagestan, Russia. Population: 77 (2021 census); 69 (2002 census); 44 (1989 Soviet census).

== Geography ==
Selo is located 159 km from Makhachkala (capital of Dagestan) and 1,645 km from Moscow. Asakh is the nearest rural locality.
