= Anoushavan Ter-Ghevondyan =

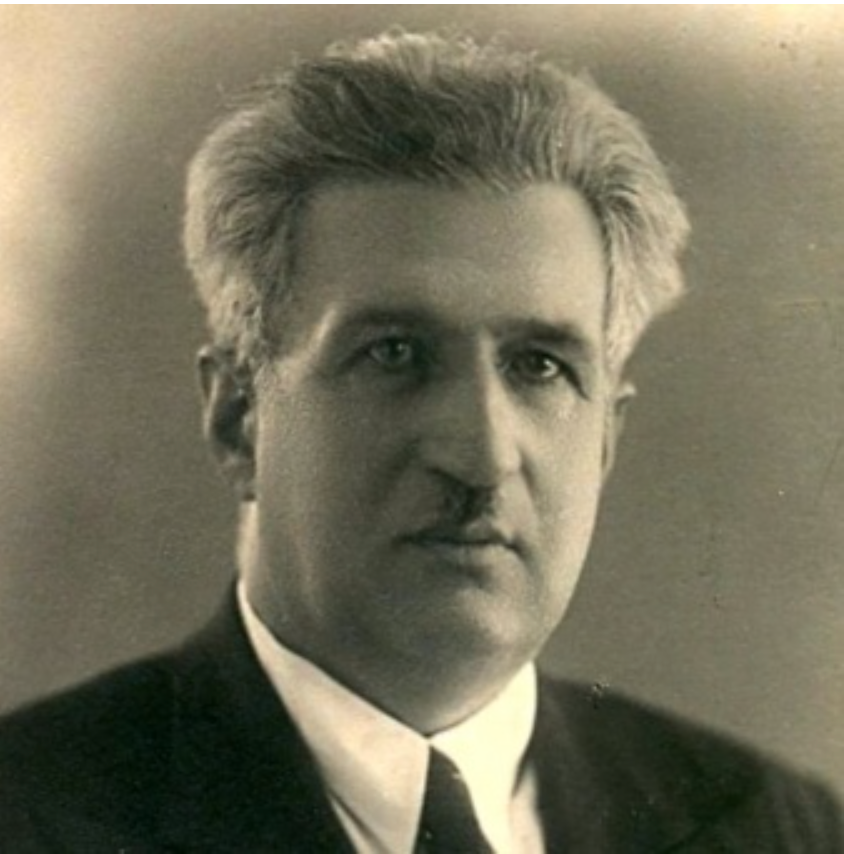

Background information
- Born: March 8, 1887; Tiflis
- Died: June 6, 1961 (aged 74); Yerevan
- Genres: Classical
- Occupation(s): Composer, pedagogue
- Years active: 1914-1959

Anoushavan Ter-Ghevondyan (Armenian: Անուշավան Գրիգորի Տեր-Ղևոնդյան; 8 March 1887 – 6 June 1961) was an Armenian composer, pedagogue, and sociocultural activist. His father was the photographer Grigor Ter-Ghevondyan; and his daughter, pianist Heghine Ter-Ghevondyan.

== Early life ==
Anoushavan Ter-Ghevondyan received his general education and musical training in Tiflis (now Tbilisi). In 1915 he graduated from the Faculty of Law of St. Petersburg University, as well as the St. Petersburg Conservatory, where he studied with Anatoly Lyadov (harmony), Alexander Glazunov (composition), Vasily Kalafati (counterpoint), Jāzeps Vītols (analysis of form) and Maximilian Steinberg (orchestration).

In 1914, in partnership with Armenian composer and conductor Spiridon Melikyan, he undertook a scientific expedition to the Shirak Province, one of the musically most fertile regions. This trip resulted in the compilation of 252 folk melodies that were of great value and have been widely used by Armenian composers and musicologists ever since. Anoushavan Ter-Ghevondyan himself arranged some of them into a symphonic work named ″Շիրակի էտյուդները″ (Shirak Etudes) (1916).

== Music ==
Among his works there are two operas, «Սեդա» (Seda) (1922) and «Արեգակի ցոլքերում» (In the Rays of the Sun) (1949); two ballets, «Հրո հարսը» (Bride of Fire) (1923) and «Անահիտ» (Anahit) (1940); a vocal-symphonic poem, «Վահագնի ծնունդը» (The Birth of Vahagn) (1923); a symphonic poem, «Ախթամար» (Akhtamar) (1923); choral works, romances, songs, and instrumental compositions. In his creations Ter-Ghevondyan displays an epic, as well as a lyrical strain. His scores display melodic originality, rhythmic ingenuity, and a colorful orchestration. He absorbs the Armenian folk flavor and the Russian classicism, combining them into a unique voice.

He has authored a booklet on Richard Wagner published in 1933 and two volumes on music theory in 1934.

Anoushavan Ter-Ghevondyan had a long-lasting pedagogical career. In 1917-1925 he taught at the Tiflis Conservatory; he was on the faculty and later was appointed rector of the Komitas State Conservatory of Yerevan, 1926–1934; director of Baku Academy of Music, 1934–1938; head of the composition department of the Yerevan Conservatory, 1938–1959.

There is a school named after him in the Kanaker-Zeytun District of Yerevan.

== Awards ==
- People's Artist of the Armenian SSR in 1953
- Order of the Red Banner of Labour in 1956

== Bibliography ==
- Գիլինա, Եվգենյա. Անուշավան Տեր-Ղևոնդյան, Երևան, 1962.
- Тигранов, Тигра́н. Армянский музыкальный театр.- т. 2, гл. 1.- Ереван, 1960, с. 7-28.
