= Geniyatl =

Geniyatl Гениятль
- Selo
- Location within Republic of Dagestan Location within Russia
- Coordinates: 42°14′N 46°02′E
- Country: Russia
- Region: Republic of Dagestan
- District: Tsuntinsky District
- Time zone: UTC+3:00

Geniyatl (Russian: Гениятль) is a rural locality (a selo) in Tsuntinsky District, Republic of Dagestan, Russia. Population: 130 (2021 census); 162 (2002 census); 118 (1989 Soviet census).

== Geography ==
Selo is located 145 km from Makhachkala (capital of Dagestan) and 1,655 km from Moscow. Shaitli is the nearest rural locality.
