= Vitsiyatl =

Vitsiyatl Вициятль
- Selo
- Location within Republic of Dagestan Location within Russia
- Coordinates: 42°11′N 45°53′E
- Country: Russia
- Region: Republic of Dagestan
- District: Tsuntinsky District
- Time zone: UTC+3:00

Vitsiyatl (Russian: Вициятль) is a rural locality (a selo) in Tsuntinsky District, Republic of Dagestan, Russia. Population: 142 (2021 census); 176 (2002 census); 111 (1989 Soviet census). There is 1 street in this selo.

== Geography ==
Selo is located 158 km from Makhachkala (capital of Dagestan) and 1,654 km from Moscow. Khibiyatl is the nearest rural locality.
