= Khetokh =

Khetokh Хетох
- Selo
- Location within Republic of Dagestan Location within Russia
- Coordinates: 42°15′N 45°58′E
- Country: Russia
- Region: Republic of Dagestan
- District: Tsuntinsky District
- Time zone: UTC+3:00

Khetokh (Russian: Хетох) is a rural locality (a selo) in Tsuntinsky District, Republic of Dagestan, Russia. Population: 32 (2021 census); 40 (2002 census); 11 (1989 Soviet census). There are 2 streets in this selo.

== Geography ==
Selo is located 148 km from Makhachkala (capital of Dagestan) and 1,651 km from Moscow. Kuitli is the nearest rural locality.
