= Shauri =

Shauri Шаури
- Selo
- Location within Republic of Dagestan Location within Russia
- Coordinates: 42°16′N 45°56′E
- Country: Russia
- Region: Republic of Dagestan
- District: Tsuntinsky District
- Time zone: UTC+3:00

Shauri (Russian: Шаури) is a rural locality (a selo) in Tsuntinsky District, Republic of Dagestan, Russia. Population: 433 (2021 census); 241 (2002 census); 130 (1989 Soviet census). There is 1 street in this selo.

== Geography ==
Selo is located 150 km from Makhachkala (capital of Dagestan) and 1,648 km from Moscow. Azilta is the nearest rural locality.
