= Helma van den Berg =

Dutch linguist and Caucasologist (1965–2003)

- Born: Helma Everdina van den Berg; May 26, 1965; Veenendaal, Netherlands
- Died: November 11, 2003 (aged 38); Derbent, Dagestan, Russia
- Occupations: Linguist, translator
- Awards: VIDI Innovation Fellowship

Academic background
- Education: Leiden University

Academic work
- Discipline: Linguistics
- Sub-discipline: Caucasian languages
- Institutions: Max Planck Institute for Evolutionary Anthropology

Helma Everdina van den Berg (May 26, 1965 – November 11, 2003) was a Dutch linguist specializing in Caucasian languages.

== Life and work ==
Van den Berg was born and raised in Veenendaal, the Netherlands. She earned her PhD from Leiden University from 1983 to 1988. In addition to being a linguist, van den Berg was an accredited translator of Russian and Polish. After earning her doctorate, she remained in Leiden as research fellow from 1995 to 2000, studying the verbal morphology and syntax of Dargi, another East Caucasian language.

In 2000, Helma joined the Linguistics Department of the Max Planck Institute for Evolutionary Anthropology in Leipzig, Germany, where she became recognized as the resident specialist in Caucasian, especially Daghestanian, languages, some of which remain unwritten.

Van den Berg did field work on several under-documented East Caucasian languages, especially Hunzib and Dargi. She produced a Hunzib reference grammar and a collection of Dargi folktales with accompanying sketch grammar.

At the time of her death, van den Berg was working on a grammar of the Avar language. She had also just received a VIDI Innovation Fellowship from the Netherlands Organisation for Scientific Research, "which would have enabled her to set up her own research group to conduct research into Caucasian languages and to train a new generation of specialists in these languages during the period 2004–2009."

Her former colleagues have made an effort to bring van den Berg's research to print if it remained unpublished after her sudden death.

== Personal life ==
Van den Berg was married to Leo Vogelenzang. She died in Derbent, Daghestan, Russia of a heart attack at 38 years of age while she was conducting fieldwork with native-speaker collaborators.

== Selected publications ==
Van den Berg published many papers, including

- van den Berg, Helma Everdina (1995). A grammar of Hunzib (with texts and lexicon). LINCOM studies in Caucasian linguistics, 01. Munchen: Lincom Europa. ISBN 3-89586-006-9. OCLC 898928985. Also Leiden University PhD thesis.
- Van Den Berg, H. "Gender and person agreement in Akusha Dargi". Folia Linguistica Historica. 33 (1 December 2012): 153–168. doi:10.1515/flin.1999.33.1-2.153. OCLC 827308065.
- Dargi folktales. Oral stories from the Caucasus with an introduction to Dargi grammar. 2001. Leiden: Research School of Asian, African and Amerindian Studies. ISBN 90-5789-066-6.
- A Dargi electronic dictionary: the perspective of the linguist and the speakers. 2003. Международный симпозиум по полевой лингвистике. Тезисы докладов. Москва, сс. 8-9 [ International Symposium on Field Linguistics. Abstracts of papers. Moscow pp. 8–9].
- Spatial prefixes in Dargi (East Caucasian). Acta Linguistica Hungarica 50.1-2 (2003): 201-225.
- The east Caucasian language family. Lingua 115.1-2 (2005): 147-190.
