= Altun =

Altun is a Turkish surname meaning gold or golden. Notable people with the surname include:

== People ==
- Berfin Altun (born 1999), Turkish female weightlifter
- Gamze Altun (born 2003), Turkish female weightlifter
- Hakan Altun (born 1972), Turkish singer
- Meryem Altun (1976–2002), Turkish prisoner, who died on hunger strike
- Selçuk Altun (born 1950), Turkish writer
- Yunus Altun (born 1977), Turkish footballer
- Fahrettin Altun (born 1976), Turkish politician

== See also ==
- Altyn-Tagh (Altun Mountains)
- Altun Ha, ruins of an ancient Mayan city in Belize
