= Tsunta =

Rural locality in Dagestan, Russia

Coordinates: 42°12′11″N 45°56′07″E

Tsunta (Russian: Цунта) is a rural locality (a selo) and the administrative center of Tsuntinsky District of the Republic of Dagestan, Russia.

Between 1991 and 2017 the selo of Kidero served as the administrative center of Tsuntinsky District, however, it lacks the necessary infrastructure. In 2017, the district center was moved to Tsunta.
