= Hunzib people =

Hunzibs
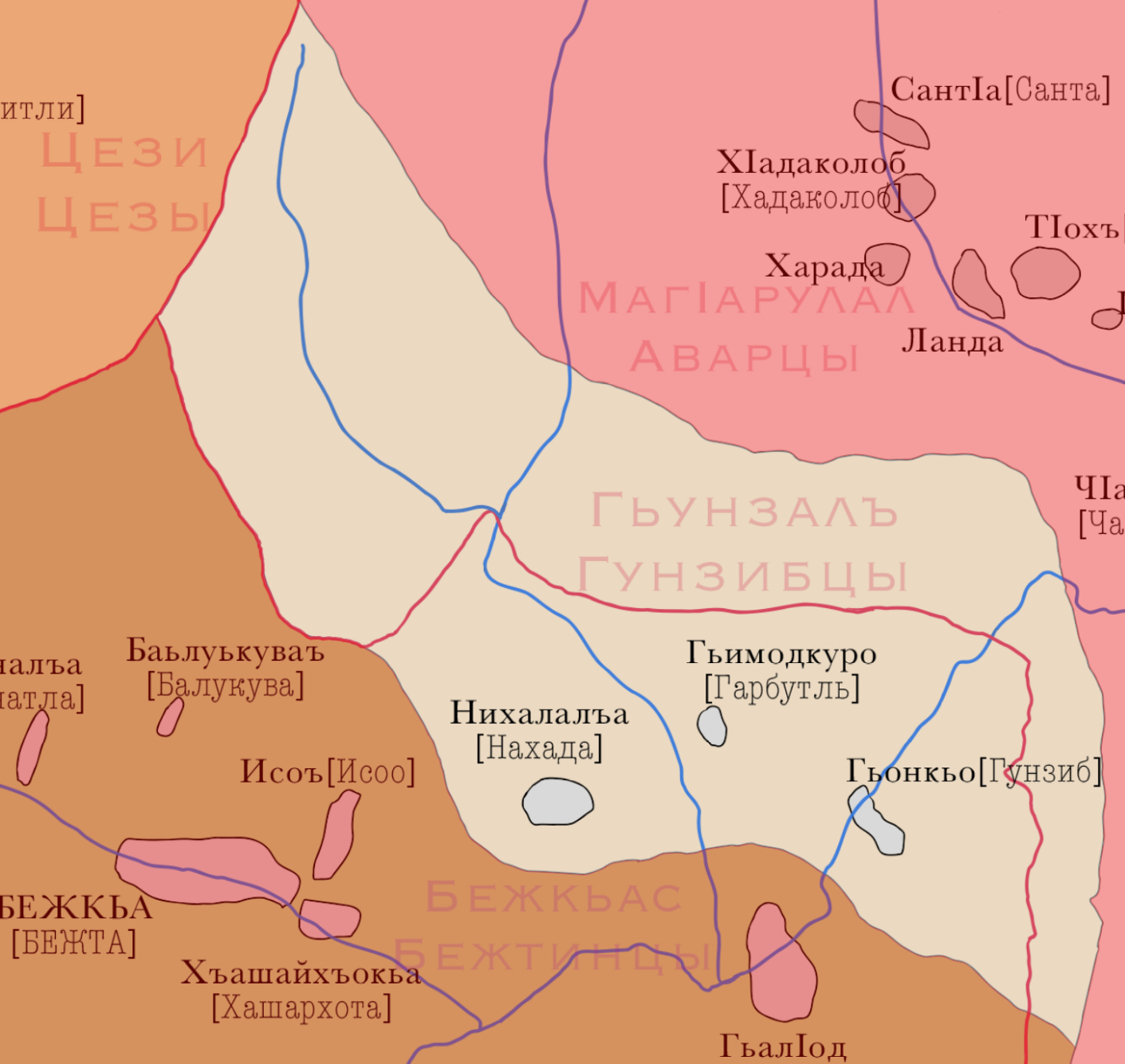

Total population
- c. 6,200 (highest est.)

Regions with significant populations
- Russia: Dagestan: 2,363 (2021 census)
- Georgia: c. 1,860 (highest est.)

Languages
- Hunzib

Religion
- Sunni Islam

Related ethnic groups
- Northeast Caucasian peoples

The Hunzibs are an indigenous people of Dagestan, North Caucasus living in three villages in the Tsuntinsky District in the upper regions of the Avar-Koysu river area. They have their own language, Hunzib, and primarily follow Sunni Islam, which spread among the Hunzib people around the 8th or 9th century. Islam became consolidated among the Hunzib around the 16th and 17th centuries. The land where the Hunzibs inhabit was part of the Avar Khanate. The only time that the Hunzibs were counted as a distinct ethnic group in the Russian Census was in 1926, when 105 people reported to be ethnic Hunzibs. Subsequently, they were listed as Avars in the Russian Censuses. In 1967, it was estimated that there were about 600 ethnic Hunzibs (E. Bokarev).

== Genetics ==
According to genetic studies in 2016, the following haplogroup are found to among Hunzib:

- J1 (100%)
