= Ruben Altunyan =

Armenian composer and conductor (1939–2021)

- Born: 31 March 1939; Yerevan, Armenian SSR, Soviet Union
- Died: 21 November 2021 (aged 82)
- Occupation(s): Composer, conductor

Ruben Tatuli Altunyan (Armenian: Ռուբեն Թաթուլի Ալթունյան; 31 March 1939 – 21 November 2021) was an Armenian composer, violist, and conductor. He was the son of conductor Tatul Altunyan.

== Selected works ==
- String Quartet No. 1 (1962)
- Perpetuum Mobile (Անընդհատ շարժում) for violin and piano (1964)
- Concerto-Symphony (Կոնցերտ-Սիմֆոնիա; Концерт-Симфония) for violin, viola and symphony orchestra (1966)
- Sonata for violin and piano (1966)
- Sonata for cello solo (1977)
- Symphony (1980)
- String Quartet No. 2 (1996)
- Symphony for chamber orchestra (1997)
- Tamzara (Թամզարա) for symphony orchestra (2004)
- Book of Lamentations (Մատյան ողբերգության), Ballet-Oratorio after Gregory of Narek (2010)
- Piano Trio (2012)
- Khachatriana (Խաչատրիանա) for chamber orchestra (2013)
