= Hunzib language =

Northeast Caucasian language spoken in Dagestan

Hunzib
- Gunzib
- гьонкьос мыц honƛʼos mɨc
- Pronunciation: [ˈhont͡ɬʼos mɨt͡s]
- Native to: North Caucasus
- Region: Southern Dagestan
- Native speakers: 1,400 (2006–2010); 3,466 (2020)
- Language family: Northeast Caucasian: Tsezic; Bezhta–Hunzib–Khwarshi; Hunzib
- Writing system: Cyrillic

Language codes
- ISO 639-3: huz
- Glottolog: hunz1247
- ELP: Hunzib
- Hunzib

- Hunzib is classified as Definitely Endangered by the UNESCO Atlas of the World's Languages in Danger (2010)

Hunzib is a Northeast Caucasian language spoken by the Hunzib people in the Tsunta and Kizilyurt districts of Dagestan and in two villages across the Russian border in Georgia. Hunzib is not an official language, and it is rarely written.

== Classification ==
Hunzib belongs to the Tsezic group of the Northeast Caucasian languages. It is most closely related to Bezhta and Khwarshi, according to the latest research. Other Tsezic languages include Tsez and Hinukh. Khwarshi was previously grouped together with Tsez and Hinukh instead of with Hunzib.

== Phonology ==
=== Vowels ===
Vowels in Hunzib may be short, long, or nasalized.

	Front	Central	Back
Close	i	ɨ	u
Mid	e	ə	o
Open		a	ɑ

=== Consonants ===
Hunzib has 35 consonants. Three consonants, /x/, /ħ/, and /ʕ/, are only found in loanwords.

		Bilabial	Alveolar		Palatal	Velar	Uvular	Pharyngeal	Glottal
		Bilabial	central	lateral	Palatal	Velar	Uvular	Pharyngeal	Glottal
Nasal		m	n						
Plosive	voiceless	p	t			k	q		ʔ
Plosive	voiced	b	d			ɡ			
Plosive	ejective	pʼ	tʼ			kʼ	qʼ		
Affricate	voiceless		t͡s	t͡ɬ	t͡ʃ				
Affricate	ejective		t͡sʼ	t͡ɬʼ	t͡ʃʼ				
Fricative	voiceless		s	ɬ	ʃ	x	χ	ħ	h
Fricative	voiced		z		ʒ		ʁ	ʕ	
Trill			r						
Approximant				l	j	w			

== Grammar ==
=== Gender ===
Like a number of other Northeast Caucasian languages, Hunzib has a grammatical gender system with five classes. The first classes, I and II mark male and female rationals, respectively, while the remaining classes mark non-humans. Gender marking is covert on nouns, but appears in agreement on verbs, adjectives, pronouns, and adverbial constructions.

Class	Sg.	Pl.
I	∅-	b-^{1}
II	j-	b-^{1}
III	j-	r-^{1}
IV	b-^{1}	r-^{1}
V	r-^{1}	r-^{1}

1. When preceding a nasalized vowel, class markers b- and r- surface as m- and n- respectively.

=== Nouns ===
Nouns in Hunzib come in five noun classes: male, female, and three classes for inanimate objects. There are a number of cases in Hunzib, including the absolutive, ergative, genitive, instrumental. A number of other case-like markers indicate direction and include dative, adessive, superessive, contactive, comitative and allative declensions. The following are taken from Helma van den Berg's A Grammar of Hunzib.

==== Case ====
Hunzib has four basic grammatical cases, the absolutive, ergative, genitive, and instrumental. The absolutive case is formed from the base stem, and the other cases are formed from the oblique stem.

Case	Marker
Absolutive	-∅
Ergative	-l^{1} / -lo^{2}, -y
Genitive	-s
Instrumental	-d^{1} / -do^{2}

1. After vowels
2. After consonants

Hunzib also has a series of local cases, where localizations are combined with directional suffixes. The dative and adessive cases have syntactic functions as well, but are morphologically local.

Localization	Marker	Elative	Translative
Dative	-V^{1}	-V^{1}-sə	-V^{1}-ƛʼ(i)
Adessive	-g(o)	-go-s	***
Superessive	-ƛʼ(o)	-ƛo-s	-ƛʼo-ƛʼ
Subessive	-ƛ	(-ƛ-sə)	***
Contacting	-λ	-λ-sə	-λ-ƛʼi
Comitative	-ǧur	-ǧur-sə	-ǧur-ƛʼi
Allative	-dər	-dər-sə	-dər-ƛʼi
Approximative	-do	-do-V	

1. The vowel in these forms will be a duplicate of the vowel in the syllable to which it attaches.

==== Oblique stem ====
Cases other than the absolutive are formed by attaching the relevant case marker to an oblique stem, which is often the base stem plus some lexically determined extension.

Extension	Notes	Extension	Notes
-li	Productive; found more with nouns ending in a consonant	-ba	Rare
-a	Common; with nouns ending in a consonant or vowel (but esp. -u)	-y	Rare
-lo	Common; mostly with nouns ending in -i	-ɑ/e/o/u	Rare
-yo	Common; mostly with nouns ending in -i	-la	Rare
-i	Common; mostly with nouns ending in a vowel	-mo	Rare
-bo	Common; with nouns ending in a consonant or vowel	-di/u/o	Rare
-ra/o/u	Rare		
-tʼu	Rare		

Some nouns (around 7%) do not use any extension and the oblique and base stems are identical. These words generally end in a vowel, like "father" ABS [ɑbu], GEN [ɑbu-s]. A small number of Hunzib nouns exhibit stem alternation, like "moon" ABS [bot͡so], GEN [bɨt͡sə].

=== Verbs ===
Most verbs agree in class and number with the noun in the phrase that is in the absolutive case. As Hunzib has ergative alignment, that equals the subject of intransitive sentences and the direct object of transitive sentences.

=== Word order ===
Hunzib usually follows a subject–object–verb word order.
