= Meryem Altun =

Turkish prisoner (1976–2002)

Meryem Altun (1976 – April 1, 2002) was a Turkish prisoner who died on hunger strike. She attended Umraniye high school and was a critic of the Turkish prison system. She was declared a martyr by the Revolutionary People's Liberation Front. Altun was in Umraniye prison at the time of a December 19, 2000 massacre of prisoners by prison guards.
