= Spiridon Melikyan =

Armenian musicologist and composer (1880 - 1933)

Spridon Melikian
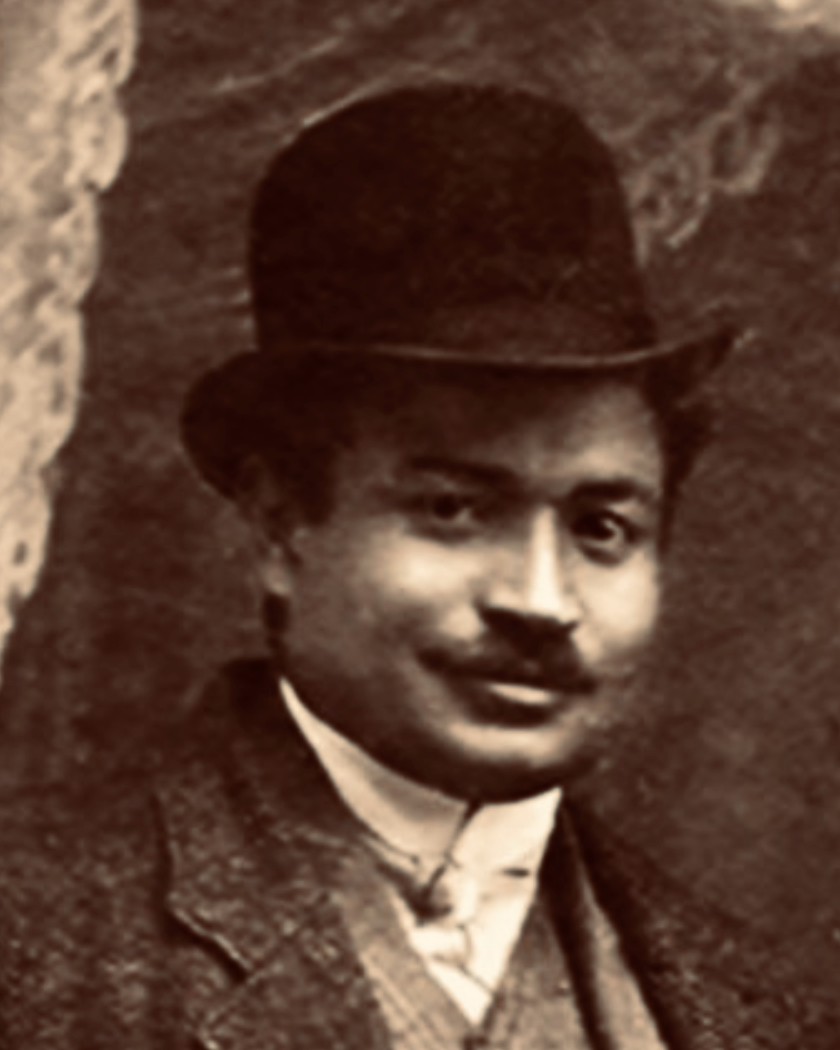
- Spiridon Melikian
- Born: December 1, 1880; Vagharshapat
- Died: April 4, 1933 (aged 53); Yerevan
- Occupations: musicologist, composer, choirmaster, teacher
- Years active: 1900s–1930s

Spiridon Melikyan (Armenian: Սպիրիդոն Ավետիսի Մելիքյան; 1 December 1880; – 4 April 1933) was an Armenian musicologist, composer, choirmaster, and teacher. His son composer Hrachya Melikyan died in 1942 during the Mogilev offensive in World War II.

== Early life ==
Spiridon was born on 1 December 1880 in Vagharshapat, the Erivan Governorate of the Russian Empire, into a family of teachers. At an early age he lost his parents, and was raised by his uncles. He entered the Gevorgian Seminary when he was thirteen. His superior singing ability caught the attention of Komitas, his teacher, who appointed him as his assistant upon graduation.

In his memoires, his schoolmate Simak Sahakyan writes: “I met Spiridon Melikyan in 1895. We became good friends, for we understood each other’s language…. He was familiar with folk songs as well as liturgical chants. From fifth grade on, he was designated head chorister for all the student chanters who sang in the church.”

In 1902 Melikyan graduated from the seminary and was ordained a deacon. He joined the faculty and taught there for three years. Adhering to Komitas's council, he went to Berlin from 1905 to 1908 to study at the Richard Schmidt private conservatory. Komitas advised him to concentrate on ancient and modern music history, cultivate his voice, and deepen his knowledge of the choral art.

Komitas loaned him his huge collection of Armenian folk songs to copy and take it with him to Berlin. That providential decision saved the collection from loss, for the original manuscript disappeared along the way. Fortunately, in 1931 Melikyan published the copy he had made, «Ազգագրական ժողովածու» (Ethnographic collection), thus saving a national treasure.

== Musical Activities ==
Upon his return to Armenia in 1908, Spiridon Melikyan decided to dedicate himself exclusively to music, left the church and renounced his order of deaconship. After a year of teaching in Shushi, he settled in Tiflis, becoming a music teacher and choirmaster at the Nersisian School. In 1917, he founded and directed the Armenian Choral Society, he lectured widely and authored textbooks on singing, elevating the musical sophistication of the community.

With the establishment of Soviet Armenia, Melikyan moved to Yerevan and began teaching in local music schools. In 1927, he joined the faculty of the Yerevan Conservatory (now Komitas State Conservatory of Yerevan) and taught music theory and conducted its choir. He was the rector of the Conservatory between 1930 and 1931, and the head of the theory department during 1931 to 1932. With the seventy-five-member conservatory choir, Melikian toured various cities, including a performance in Moscow.

== Works ==
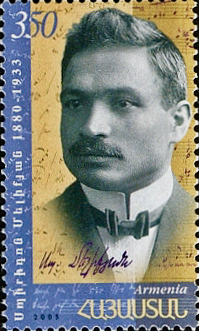

Spiridon Melikyan's most significant contribution to Armenian music has been his publication of various compendiums of folk music, including «Շիրակի երգեր» (Songs of Shirak), collected with Anoushavan Ter-Ghevondyan in 1914, pub. 1917;. «Հայ ժողովրդական երգեր և պարեր» (Armenian folk songs and dances), two vols, pub. 1949–1952; «Վանա ժողովրդական երգեր» (Folk songs of Van), two vols, pub. 1927–1928, collected by his student G. Gardashyan; «Ազգագրական ժողովածու» (Ethnographic collection), pub. 1931, collected by Komitas.

Melikyan's own compositions include «Ախթամար» (Akhtamar), a ballad for orchestra and chorus, several arrangements of folk songs for solo voice and choir, some having a permanent place in the repertoire. Spiridon Melikian has also dabbled in several musicological studies, such as «Հունական ազդեցութիւնը հայ երաժշտության տեսականի վրայ» (The Influence of Greek on the Theory of Armenian Music), and «Հայ ժողովրդական երգի գամմաներ» (The Scales of Armenian Folk Songs). However, these texts contain errors and have methodological issues; they do not meet the scholarly standard.

Spiridon Melikyan was given the title of Honored Art Worker of Armenian SSR in 1933. Shortly thereafter, on 4 May 1933, he died of cancer. He is buried in the Komitas Pantheon in Yerevan.
