= Tatul Altunyan =

Armenian conductor (1901–1973)

Tatul Altunyan Թաթուլ Ալթունյան
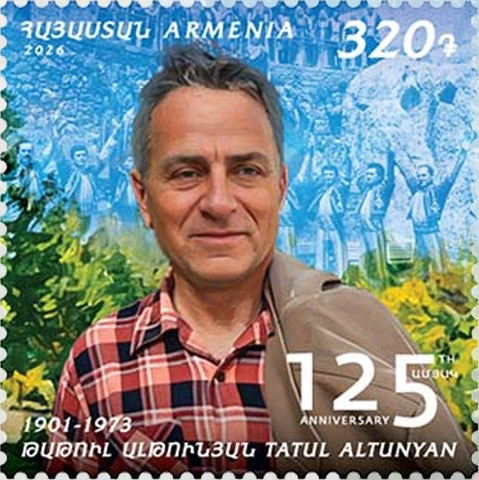

Background information
- Born: October 2, 1901; Adana, Adana Vilayet, Ottoman Empire
- Died: November 29, 1973 (aged 72) Yerevan, Armenian SSR, Soviet Union
- Occupations: Conductor, professor

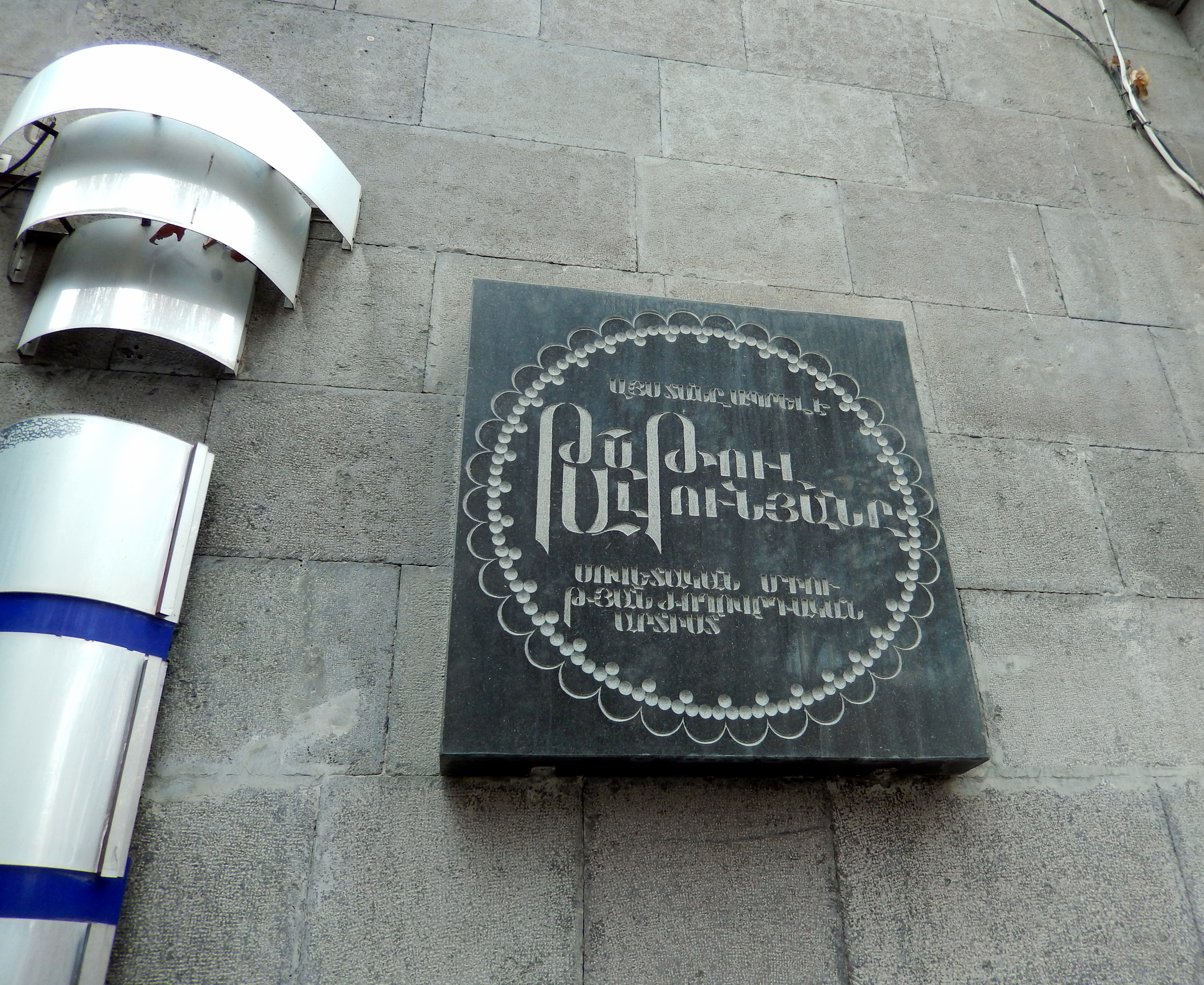
Tatul Altunyan's plaque in Yerevan

Tatul Tigrani Altunyan (Note: Armenian: Թաթուլ Տիգրանի Ալթունյան, romanized: Tʻatʻul Tigrani Altʻunyan Western Armenian: Թաթուլ Ալթունեան, romanized: Tʿatʿul Altʿunean) (October 2, 1901 [O.S. October 15] – November 29, 1973) was an Armenian conductor, the founder of Armenian State Song-Dance Ensemble (currently named after him), People's Artist of USSR (1965), recipient of the State Prize of the USSR (1950) and university professor.

== Biography ==
Altunyan was born in Adana, Adana Vilayet, Ottoman Empire. He was the student of Romanos Melikian and Spiridon Melikyan. In 1934, after graduating from the Komitas State Conservatory of Yerevan, he studied at the Leningrad State Conservatory. Altunyan founded the Armenian National Song and Dance Ensemble in 1938, and acted as its principal conductor, giving performances around the world, until 1970. The ensemble is remembered as a "perfect illustration of the beauty of traditional Armenian music".

Altunyan died in 1973 in Yerevan and is buried at the Tokhmakh Cemetery in Yerevan, along with his wife Olga Altunyan. He is the father of conductor Zhirayr Altunyan, and composer Ruben Altunyan, Karen Altunyan and Jilda Altunyan.
