= Kidero (rural locality) =

Rural locality in Dagestan, Russia

Coordinates: 42°11′32″N 45°57′41″E

Kidero (Russian: Кидеро, Chechen: Кидеро) is a rural locality (a selo) in Tsuntinsky District of the Republic of Dagestan, Russia. Population: 752 (2010 census); 612 (2002 census);

Between 1991 and 2017 Kidero served as the administrative center of Tsuntinsky District, however, it lacks the necessary infrastructure. In 2017, the district center was moved into the selo of Tsunta.
