= Tsuntinsky District =

Tsuntinsky District Цунтинский район (Russian)
- District

Other transcription(s)
  - Avar: ЦІунтІа мухъ
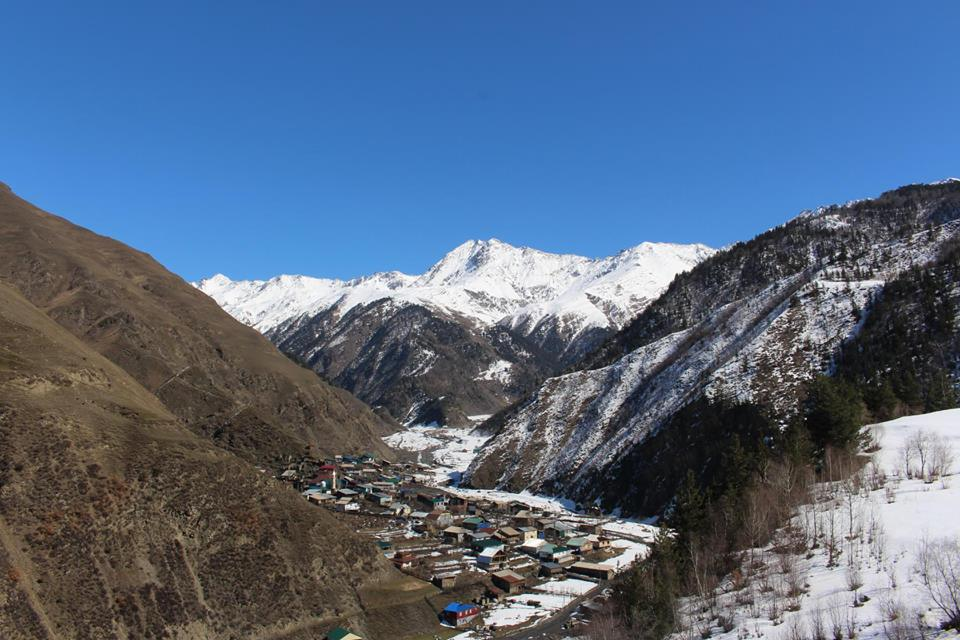

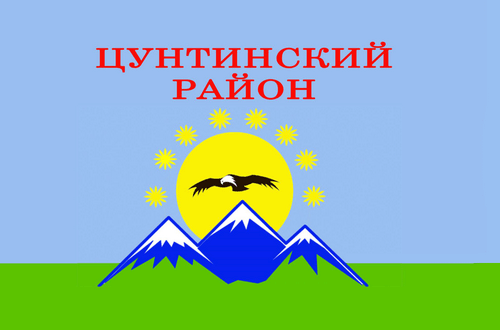
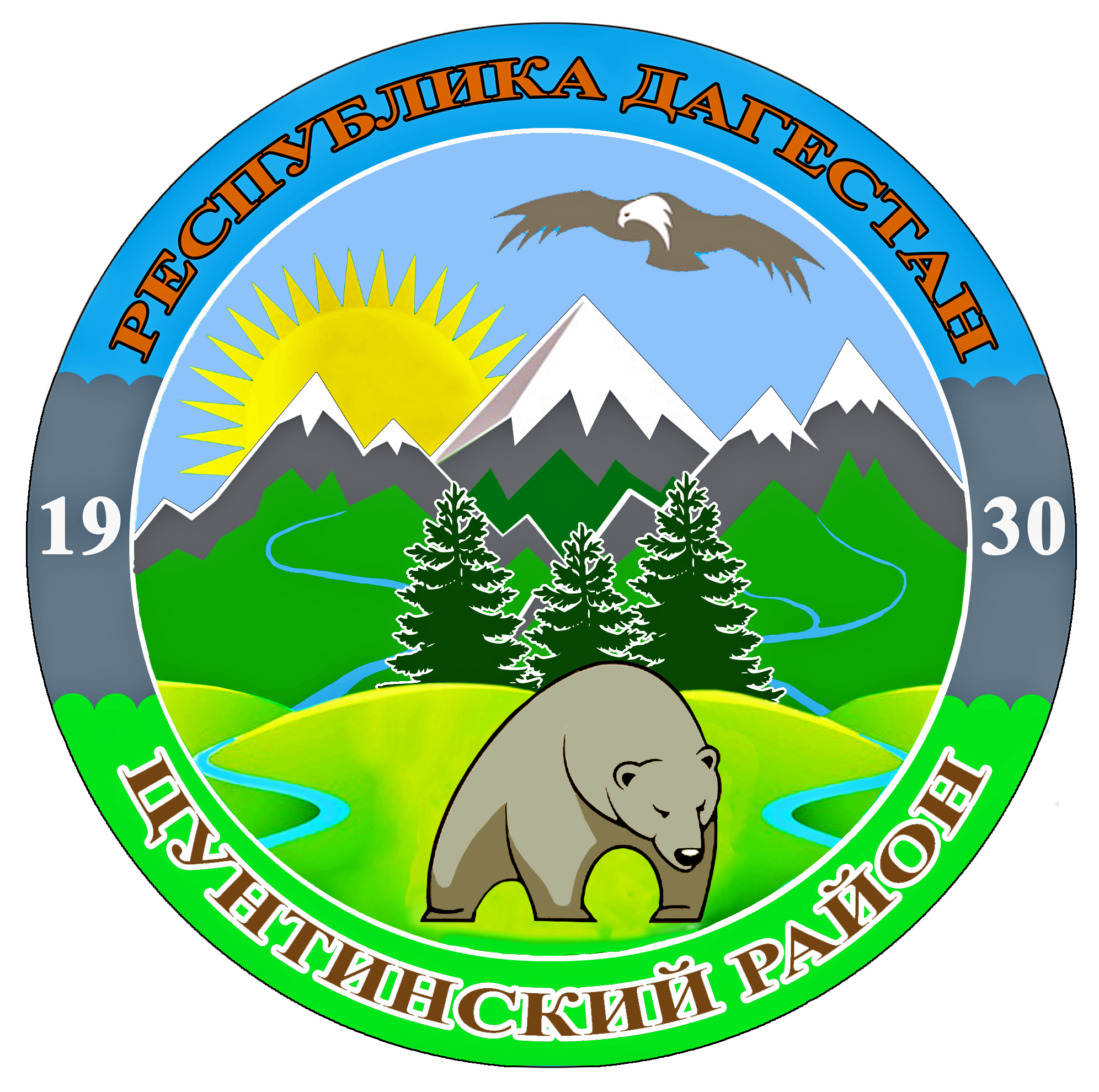
- Flag Coat of arms
- Location of Tsuntinsky District in the Republic of Dagestan
- Coordinates: 42°12′N 45°58′E
- Country: Russia
- Federal subject: Republic of Dagestan
- Established: 1930
- Administrative center: Tsunta

Area
  - Total: 1,327 km^{2} (512 sq mi)

Population (2010 Census)
  - Total: 18,282
  - Density: 13.78/km^{2} (35.68/sq mi)
  - Urban: 0%
  - Rural: 100%

Administrative structure
  - Administrative divisions: 12 Selsoviets
  - Inhabited localities: 55 rural localities

Municipal structure
  - Municipally incorporated as: Tsuntinsky Municipal District
  - Municipal divisions: 0 urban settlements, 13 rural settlements
- Time zone: UTC+3 (MSK)
- OKTMO ID: 82658000
- Website: http://www.cunta.ru

Population of Tsuntinsky District
- 2010 Census: 18,282
- 2002 Census: 17,466
- 1989 Census: 13,374
- 1979 Census: 11,229

Tsuntinsky District (Russian: Цунти́нский райо́н) is an administrative and municipal district (raion), one of the forty-one in the Republic of Dagestan, Russia. It is located in the southwest of the republic. The area of the district is 1,327 square kilometers (512 sq mi). Its administrative center is the rural locality (a selo) of Tsunta. As of the 2010 Census, the total population of the district was 18,282, with the population of Kidero, the district center at the time, accounting for 4.1% of that number.

== History ==
Between 1991 and 2017 the selo of Kidero served as the administrative center of Tsuntinsky District, however, it lacks the necessary infrastructure. In 2017, the district center was moved into the selo of Tsunta.

== Administrative and municipal status ==
Within the framework of administrative divisions, Tsuntinsky District is one of the forty-one in the Republic of Dagestan. The district is divided into twelve selsoviets which comprise fifty-five rural localities. As a municipal division, the district is incorporated as Tsuntinsky Municipal District. Its twelve selsoviets are incorporated as thirteen rural settlements within the municipal district. The selo of Tsunta serves as the administrative center of both the administrative and municipal district.

== Demographics ==
Ethnic composition:

- Tsez people: 53.9%
- Bezhta people: 35.1%
- Hunzib people: 4.8%
- Hinukh people: 2.7%
- Russians: 1.2%

The main languages are Tsez and Hinuq.
